

530001–530100 

|-bgcolor=#E9E9E9
| 530001 ||  || — || October 16, 2006 || Kitt Peak || Spacewatch ||  || align=right data-sort-value="0.86" | 860 m || 
|-id=002 bgcolor=#d6d6d6
| 530002 ||  || — || September 3, 2010 || Mount Lemmon || Mount Lemmon Survey || 3:2 || align=right | 4.1 km || 
|-id=003 bgcolor=#d6d6d6
| 530003 ||  || — || November 8, 2010 || Mount Lemmon || Mount Lemmon Survey ||  || align=right | 3.2 km || 
|-id=004 bgcolor=#E9E9E9
| 530004 ||  || — || November 20, 2006 || Kitt Peak || Spacewatch ||  || align=right data-sort-value="0.74" | 740 m || 
|-id=005 bgcolor=#d6d6d6
| 530005 ||  || — || November 1, 2010 || Mount Lemmon || Mount Lemmon Survey ||  || align=right | 3.0 km || 
|-id=006 bgcolor=#fefefe
| 530006 ||  || — || November 6, 2010 || Kitt Peak || Spacewatch ||  || align=right data-sort-value="0.59" | 590 m || 
|-id=007 bgcolor=#E9E9E9
| 530007 ||  || — || December 10, 2006 || Kitt Peak || Spacewatch ||  || align=right data-sort-value="0.83" | 830 m || 
|-id=008 bgcolor=#fefefe
| 530008 ||  || — || April 18, 2009 || Mount Lemmon || Mount Lemmon Survey ||  || align=right data-sort-value="0.84" | 840 m || 
|-id=009 bgcolor=#fefefe
| 530009 ||  || — || November 7, 2010 || Mount Lemmon || Mount Lemmon Survey ||  || align=right data-sort-value="0.67" | 670 m || 
|-id=010 bgcolor=#fefefe
| 530010 ||  || — || September 17, 2003 || Kitt Peak || Spacewatch ||  || align=right data-sort-value="0.62" | 620 m || 
|-id=011 bgcolor=#d6d6d6
| 530011 ||  || — || September 30, 2010 || Mount Lemmon || Mount Lemmon Survey ||  || align=right | 2.9 km || 
|-id=012 bgcolor=#fefefe
| 530012 ||  || — || October 17, 1995 || Kitt Peak || Spacewatch || NYS || align=right data-sort-value="0.65" | 650 m || 
|-id=013 bgcolor=#fefefe
| 530013 ||  || — || November 29, 2003 || Kitt Peak || Spacewatch ||  || align=right | 1.1 km || 
|-id=014 bgcolor=#E9E9E9
| 530014 ||  || — || October 28, 2010 || Kitt Peak || Spacewatch ||  || align=right | 1.9 km || 
|-id=015 bgcolor=#fefefe
| 530015 ||  || — || October 28, 2010 || Mount Lemmon || Mount Lemmon Survey || NYS || align=right data-sort-value="0.59" | 590 m || 
|-id=016 bgcolor=#fefefe
| 530016 ||  || — || April 4, 2008 || Mount Lemmon || Mount Lemmon Survey ||  || align=right data-sort-value="0.65" | 650 m || 
|-id=017 bgcolor=#d6d6d6
| 530017 ||  || — || November 5, 2010 || Mount Lemmon || Mount Lemmon Survey ||  || align=right | 2.7 km || 
|-id=018 bgcolor=#E9E9E9
| 530018 ||  || — || January 5, 2003 || Socorro || LINEAR ||  || align=right data-sort-value="0.94" | 940 m || 
|-id=019 bgcolor=#fefefe
| 530019 ||  || — || October 1, 2010 || Mount Lemmon || Mount Lemmon Survey || H || align=right data-sort-value="0.61" | 610 m || 
|-id=020 bgcolor=#fefefe
| 530020 ||  || — || November 8, 2010 || Kitt Peak || Spacewatch ||  || align=right data-sort-value="0.54" | 540 m || 
|-id=021 bgcolor=#E9E9E9
| 530021 ||  || — || October 30, 2010 || Kitt Peak || Spacewatch ||  || align=right | 1.5 km || 
|-id=022 bgcolor=#d6d6d6
| 530022 ||  || — || December 14, 1999 || Kitt Peak || Spacewatch ||  || align=right | 3.2 km || 
|-id=023 bgcolor=#fefefe
| 530023 ||  || — || November 9, 2010 || Catalina || CSS ||  || align=right data-sort-value="0.70" | 700 m || 
|-id=024 bgcolor=#fefefe
| 530024 ||  || — || October 12, 2010 || Mount Lemmon || Mount Lemmon Survey ||  || align=right data-sort-value="0.73" | 730 m || 
|-id=025 bgcolor=#fefefe
| 530025 ||  || — || October 10, 2010 || Mount Lemmon || Mount Lemmon Survey || H || align=right data-sort-value="0.75" | 750 m || 
|-id=026 bgcolor=#fefefe
| 530026 ||  || — || October 28, 2010 || Mount Lemmon || Mount Lemmon Survey ||  || align=right data-sort-value="0.89" | 890 m || 
|-id=027 bgcolor=#E9E9E9
| 530027 ||  || — || October 29, 2010 || Kitt Peak || Spacewatch ||  || align=right | 2.2 km || 
|-id=028 bgcolor=#FA8072
| 530028 ||  || — || September 7, 2010 || La Sagra || OAM Obs. ||  || align=right data-sort-value="0.59" | 590 m || 
|-id=029 bgcolor=#E9E9E9
| 530029 ||  || — || October 23, 2006 || Mount Lemmon || Mount Lemmon Survey ||  || align=right data-sort-value="0.65" | 650 m || 
|-id=030 bgcolor=#d6d6d6
| 530030 ||  || — || October 28, 2010 || Mount Lemmon || Mount Lemmon Survey ||  || align=right | 2.8 km || 
|-id=031 bgcolor=#E9E9E9
| 530031 ||  || — || December 6, 2002 || Socorro || LINEAR ||  || align=right | 1.0 km || 
|-id=032 bgcolor=#E9E9E9
| 530032 ||  || — || September 5, 2010 || Mount Lemmon || Mount Lemmon Survey ||  || align=right data-sort-value="0.87" | 870 m || 
|-id=033 bgcolor=#E9E9E9
| 530033 ||  || — || November 10, 2010 || Kitt Peak || Spacewatch ||  || align=right | 1.1 km || 
|-id=034 bgcolor=#E9E9E9
| 530034 ||  || — || October 29, 2010 || Kitt Peak || Spacewatch ||  || align=right data-sort-value="0.89" | 890 m || 
|-id=035 bgcolor=#d6d6d6
| 530035 ||  || — || November 10, 2010 || Mount Lemmon || Mount Lemmon Survey || 3:2 || align=right | 3.9 km || 
|-id=036 bgcolor=#fefefe
| 530036 ||  || — || September 19, 2006 || Kitt Peak || Spacewatch || MAS || align=right data-sort-value="0.53" | 530 m || 
|-id=037 bgcolor=#E9E9E9
| 530037 ||  || — || November 16, 2006 || Kitt Peak || Spacewatch ||  || align=right data-sort-value="0.68" | 680 m || 
|-id=038 bgcolor=#fefefe
| 530038 ||  || — || November 10, 2010 || Mount Lemmon || Mount Lemmon Survey || H || align=right data-sort-value="0.70" | 700 m || 
|-id=039 bgcolor=#fefefe
| 530039 ||  || — || October 30, 2010 || Mount Lemmon || Mount Lemmon Survey ||  || align=right data-sort-value="0.90" | 900 m || 
|-id=040 bgcolor=#E9E9E9
| 530040 ||  || — || November 5, 2010 || Mount Lemmon || Mount Lemmon Survey ||  || align=right | 2.5 km || 
|-id=041 bgcolor=#d6d6d6
| 530041 ||  || — || November 11, 2010 || Mount Lemmon || Mount Lemmon Survey || 3:2 || align=right | 4.2 km || 
|-id=042 bgcolor=#E9E9E9
| 530042 ||  || — || November 16, 2006 || Kitt Peak || Spacewatch ||  || align=right data-sort-value="0.91" | 910 m || 
|-id=043 bgcolor=#E9E9E9
| 530043 ||  || — || October 30, 2010 || Mount Lemmon || Mount Lemmon Survey ||  || align=right data-sort-value="0.98" | 980 m || 
|-id=044 bgcolor=#E9E9E9
| 530044 ||  || — || November 13, 2010 || Socorro || LINEAR ||  || align=right | 2.6 km || 
|-id=045 bgcolor=#E9E9E9
| 530045 ||  || — || September 5, 2010 || Mount Lemmon || Mount Lemmon Survey ||  || align=right data-sort-value="0.80" | 800 m || 
|-id=046 bgcolor=#fefefe
| 530046 ||  || — || November 15, 2010 || Catalina || CSS || H || align=right | 1.0 km || 
|-id=047 bgcolor=#E9E9E9
| 530047 ||  || — || September 11, 2010 || Mount Lemmon || Mount Lemmon Survey || BRG || align=right | 1.2 km || 
|-id=048 bgcolor=#fefefe
| 530048 ||  || — || November 5, 2010 || Mount Lemmon || Mount Lemmon Survey || H || align=right data-sort-value="0.73" | 730 m || 
|-id=049 bgcolor=#d6d6d6
| 530049 ||  || — || August 10, 2010 || Kitt Peak || Spacewatch || Tj (2.95) || align=right | 3.7 km || 
|-id=050 bgcolor=#E9E9E9
| 530050 ||  || — || October 29, 2010 || Mount Lemmon || Mount Lemmon Survey ||  || align=right data-sort-value="0.83" | 830 m || 
|-id=051 bgcolor=#d6d6d6
| 530051 ||  || — || September 11, 2004 || Kitt Peak || Spacewatch ||  || align=right | 2.5 km || 
|-id=052 bgcolor=#fefefe
| 530052 ||  || — || October 14, 2010 || Mount Lemmon || Mount Lemmon Survey ||  || align=right data-sort-value="0.73" | 730 m || 
|-id=053 bgcolor=#fefefe
| 530053 ||  || — || September 11, 2010 || Mount Lemmon || Mount Lemmon Survey ||  || align=right data-sort-value="0.87" | 870 m || 
|-id=054 bgcolor=#E9E9E9
| 530054 ||  || — || November 22, 2006 || Catalina || CSS ||  || align=right data-sort-value="0.78" | 780 m || 
|-id=055 bgcolor=#C2E0FF
| 530055 ||  || — || September 23, 2010 || Haleakala || Pan-STARRS || cubewano? || align=right | 352 km || 
|-id=056 bgcolor=#d6d6d6
| 530056 ||  || — || April 29, 2008 || Mount Lemmon || Mount Lemmon Survey || 3:2 || align=right | 4.2 km || 
|-id=057 bgcolor=#fefefe
| 530057 ||  || — || December 17, 2006 || Mount Lemmon || Mount Lemmon Survey ||  || align=right data-sort-value="0.94" | 940 m || 
|-id=058 bgcolor=#E9E9E9
| 530058 ||  || — || November 21, 2006 || Mount Lemmon || Mount Lemmon Survey ||  || align=right data-sort-value="0.95" | 950 m || 
|-id=059 bgcolor=#E9E9E9
| 530059 ||  || — || November 7, 2010 || Mount Lemmon || Mount Lemmon Survey ||  || align=right | 1.4 km || 
|-id=060 bgcolor=#E9E9E9
| 530060 ||  || — || November 10, 2010 || Mount Lemmon || Mount Lemmon Survey ||  || align=right data-sort-value="0.94" | 940 m || 
|-id=061 bgcolor=#fefefe
| 530061 ||  || — || October 9, 2010 || Mount Lemmon || Mount Lemmon Survey ||  || align=right data-sort-value="0.96" | 960 m || 
|-id=062 bgcolor=#FA8072
| 530062 ||  || — || May 2, 2009 || Mount Lemmon || Mount Lemmon Survey || H || align=right data-sort-value="0.75" | 750 m || 
|-id=063 bgcolor=#fefefe
| 530063 ||  || — || April 27, 2009 || Kitt Peak || Spacewatch || H || align=right data-sort-value="0.46" | 460 m || 
|-id=064 bgcolor=#E9E9E9
| 530064 ||  || — || October 29, 2010 || Kitt Peak || Spacewatch ||  || align=right | 1.0 km || 
|-id=065 bgcolor=#E9E9E9
| 530065 ||  || — || November 22, 2006 || Kitt Peak || Spacewatch ||  || align=right data-sort-value="0.83" | 830 m || 
|-id=066 bgcolor=#fefefe
| 530066 ||  || — || November 6, 2010 || Kitt Peak || Spacewatch ||  || align=right data-sort-value="0.57" | 570 m || 
|-id=067 bgcolor=#E9E9E9
| 530067 ||  || — || October 29, 2010 || Catalina || CSS ||  || align=right data-sort-value="0.95" | 950 m || 
|-id=068 bgcolor=#E9E9E9
| 530068 ||  || — || October 29, 2010 || Kitt Peak || Spacewatch ||  || align=right | 1.9 km || 
|-id=069 bgcolor=#E9E9E9
| 530069 ||  || — || November 10, 2010 || Mount Lemmon || Mount Lemmon Survey ||  || align=right | 1.3 km || 
|-id=070 bgcolor=#fefefe
| 530070 ||  || — || November 27, 2010 || Mount Lemmon || Mount Lemmon Survey || H || align=right data-sort-value="0.79" | 790 m || 
|-id=071 bgcolor=#E9E9E9
| 530071 ||  || — || October 29, 2010 || Mount Lemmon || Mount Lemmon Survey ||  || align=right | 2.0 km || 
|-id=072 bgcolor=#E9E9E9
| 530072 ||  || — || October 30, 2010 || Mount Lemmon || Mount Lemmon Survey ||  || align=right | 1.3 km || 
|-id=073 bgcolor=#E9E9E9
| 530073 ||  || — || November 10, 2010 || Mount Lemmon || Mount Lemmon Survey ||  || align=right data-sort-value="0.89" | 890 m || 
|-id=074 bgcolor=#E9E9E9
| 530074 ||  || — || November 2, 2010 || Kitt Peak || Spacewatch ||  || align=right | 1.4 km || 
|-id=075 bgcolor=#FA8072
| 530075 ||  || — || November 25, 2005 || Kitt Peak || Spacewatch || H || align=right data-sort-value="0.64" | 640 m || 
|-id=076 bgcolor=#E9E9E9
| 530076 ||  || — || November 27, 2010 || Mount Lemmon || Mount Lemmon Survey ||  || align=right | 1.0 km || 
|-id=077 bgcolor=#E9E9E9
| 530077 ||  || — || December 24, 2006 || Kitt Peak || Spacewatch ||  || align=right data-sort-value="0.75" | 750 m || 
|-id=078 bgcolor=#E9E9E9
| 530078 ||  || — || November 30, 2010 || Mount Lemmon || Mount Lemmon Survey ||  || align=right | 1.5 km || 
|-id=079 bgcolor=#fefefe
| 530079 ||  || — || November 28, 2010 || Mount Lemmon || Mount Lemmon Survey || H || align=right data-sort-value="0.63" | 630 m || 
|-id=080 bgcolor=#fefefe
| 530080 ||  || — || January 20, 2008 || Mount Lemmon || Mount Lemmon Survey ||  || align=right data-sort-value="0.83" | 830 m || 
|-id=081 bgcolor=#E9E9E9
| 530081 ||  || — || November 16, 2010 || Mount Lemmon || Mount Lemmon Survey ||  || align=right | 1.1 km || 
|-id=082 bgcolor=#fefefe
| 530082 ||  || — || August 16, 2006 || Siding Spring || SSS ||  || align=right data-sort-value="0.70" | 700 m || 
|-id=083 bgcolor=#fefefe
| 530083 ||  || — || October 13, 2010 || Mount Lemmon || Mount Lemmon Survey ||  || align=right data-sort-value="0.82" | 820 m || 
|-id=084 bgcolor=#E9E9E9
| 530084 ||  || — || November 12, 2010 || Mount Lemmon || Mount Lemmon Survey ||  || align=right data-sort-value="0.89" | 890 m || 
|-id=085 bgcolor=#FFC2E0
| 530085 ||  || — || December 3, 2010 || Mount Lemmon || Mount Lemmon Survey || APOPHA || align=right data-sort-value="0.65" | 650 m || 
|-id=086 bgcolor=#E9E9E9
| 530086 ||  || — || November 6, 2010 || Mount Lemmon || Mount Lemmon Survey ||  || align=right data-sort-value="0.79" | 790 m || 
|-id=087 bgcolor=#fefefe
| 530087 ||  || — || December 2, 2010 || Kitt Peak || Spacewatch ||  || align=right data-sort-value="0.70" | 700 m || 
|-id=088 bgcolor=#E9E9E9
| 530088 ||  || — || October 14, 2010 || Mount Lemmon || Mount Lemmon Survey ||  || align=right data-sort-value="0.91" | 910 m || 
|-id=089 bgcolor=#E9E9E9
| 530089 ||  || — || May 27, 2008 || Mount Lemmon || Mount Lemmon Survey ||  || align=right | 2.2 km || 
|-id=090 bgcolor=#E9E9E9
| 530090 ||  || — || November 23, 2006 || Kitt Peak || Spacewatch ||  || align=right data-sort-value="0.65" | 650 m || 
|-id=091 bgcolor=#E9E9E9
| 530091 ||  || — || December 6, 2010 || Mount Lemmon || Mount Lemmon Survey ||  || align=right | 2.4 km || 
|-id=092 bgcolor=#FA8072
| 530092 ||  || — || November 17, 2006 || Mount Lemmon || Mount Lemmon Survey ||  || align=right data-sort-value="0.86" | 860 m || 
|-id=093 bgcolor=#E9E9E9
| 530093 ||  || — || December 2, 2010 || Mount Lemmon || Mount Lemmon Survey ||  || align=right data-sort-value="0.77" | 770 m || 
|-id=094 bgcolor=#E9E9E9
| 530094 ||  || — || January 17, 2007 || Kitt Peak || Spacewatch ||  || align=right data-sort-value="0.68" | 680 m || 
|-id=095 bgcolor=#E9E9E9
| 530095 ||  || — || October 8, 2010 || Kitt Peak || Spacewatch ||  || align=right data-sort-value="0.98" | 980 m || 
|-id=096 bgcolor=#fefefe
| 530096 ||  || — || December 7, 2010 || Mount Lemmon || Mount Lemmon Survey || H || align=right data-sort-value="0.72" | 720 m || 
|-id=097 bgcolor=#d6d6d6
| 530097 ||  || — || November 1, 2010 || Mount Lemmon || Mount Lemmon Survey ||  || align=right | 2.2 km || 
|-id=098 bgcolor=#E9E9E9
| 530098 ||  || — || December 6, 2010 || Kitt Peak || Spacewatch ||  || align=right | 1.7 km || 
|-id=099 bgcolor=#FA8072
| 530099 ||  || — || December 10, 2010 || Catalina || CSS ||  || align=right data-sort-value="0.86" | 860 m || 
|-id=100 bgcolor=#E9E9E9
| 530100 ||  || — || December 9, 2010 || Tzec Maun || E. Schwab ||  || align=right | 1.0 km || 
|}

530101–530200 

|-bgcolor=#FA8072
| 530101 ||  || — || December 4, 2010 || Mount Lemmon || Mount Lemmon Survey ||  || align=right data-sort-value="0.94" | 940 m || 
|-id=102 bgcolor=#d6d6d6
| 530102 ||  || — || October 13, 2010 || Mount Lemmon || Mount Lemmon Survey ||  || align=right | 2.7 km || 
|-id=103 bgcolor=#fefefe
| 530103 ||  || — || November 17, 2010 || Mount Lemmon || Mount Lemmon Survey || H || align=right data-sort-value="0.82" | 820 m || 
|-id=104 bgcolor=#E9E9E9
| 530104 ||  || — || November 8, 2010 || Kitt Peak || Spacewatch ||  || align=right | 1.1 km || 
|-id=105 bgcolor=#fefefe
| 530105 ||  || — || December 8, 2010 || Kitt Peak || Spacewatch || H || align=right data-sort-value="0.68" | 680 m || 
|-id=106 bgcolor=#E9E9E9
| 530106 ||  || — || January 5, 2003 || Socorro || LINEAR ||  || align=right | 1.0 km || 
|-id=107 bgcolor=#E9E9E9
| 530107 ||  || — || November 7, 2010 || Mount Lemmon || Mount Lemmon Survey ||  || align=right | 1.3 km || 
|-id=108 bgcolor=#E9E9E9
| 530108 ||  || — || August 26, 2005 || Anderson Mesa || LONEOS || JUN || align=right | 1.1 km || 
|-id=109 bgcolor=#E9E9E9
| 530109 ||  || — || August 28, 2005 || Kitt Peak || Spacewatch ||  || align=right | 1.1 km || 
|-id=110 bgcolor=#fefefe
| 530110 ||  || — || November 24, 2006 || Mount Lemmon || Mount Lemmon Survey ||  || align=right data-sort-value="0.69" | 690 m || 
|-id=111 bgcolor=#E9E9E9
| 530111 ||  || — || December 14, 2010 || Mount Lemmon || Mount Lemmon Survey ||  || align=right | 2.0 km || 
|-id=112 bgcolor=#E9E9E9
| 530112 ||  || — || December 2, 2010 || Kitt Peak || Spacewatch ||  || align=right | 2.7 km || 
|-id=113 bgcolor=#fefefe
| 530113 ||  || — || December 3, 2010 || Mount Lemmon || Mount Lemmon Survey ||  || align=right data-sort-value="0.71" | 710 m || 
|-id=114 bgcolor=#E9E9E9
| 530114 ||  || — || December 13, 2010 || Mount Lemmon || Mount Lemmon Survey ||  || align=right data-sort-value="0.97" | 970 m || 
|-id=115 bgcolor=#fefefe
| 530115 ||  || — || January 11, 2008 || Mount Lemmon || Mount Lemmon Survey ||  || align=right data-sort-value="0.87" | 870 m || 
|-id=116 bgcolor=#E9E9E9
| 530116 ||  || — || November 8, 2010 || Kitt Peak || Spacewatch ||  || align=right data-sort-value="0.86" | 860 m || 
|-id=117 bgcolor=#fefefe
| 530117 ||  || — || November 8, 2007 || Mount Lemmon || Mount Lemmon Survey || H || align=right data-sort-value="0.85" | 850 m || 
|-id=118 bgcolor=#E9E9E9
| 530118 ||  || — || November 5, 2010 || Kitt Peak || Spacewatch ||  || align=right | 1.1 km || 
|-id=119 bgcolor=#E9E9E9
| 530119 ||  || — || February 22, 1998 || Kitt Peak || Spacewatch ||  || align=right | 2.0 km || 
|-id=120 bgcolor=#d6d6d6
| 530120 ||  || — || January 2, 2011 || Mount Lemmon || Mount Lemmon Survey || 3:2 || align=right | 3.5 km || 
|-id=121 bgcolor=#FA8072
| 530121 ||  || — || December 26, 2006 || Kitt Peak || Spacewatch ||  || align=right data-sort-value="0.71" | 710 m || 
|-id=122 bgcolor=#E9E9E9
| 530122 ||  || — || January 3, 2011 || Catalina || CSS ||  || align=right | 3.6 km || 
|-id=123 bgcolor=#d6d6d6
| 530123 ||  || — || January 17, 2010 || WISE || WISE || 3:2 || align=right | 4.8 km || 
|-id=124 bgcolor=#fefefe
| 530124 ||  || — || November 5, 2010 || Mount Lemmon || Mount Lemmon Survey ||  || align=right data-sort-value="0.86" | 860 m || 
|-id=125 bgcolor=#E9E9E9
| 530125 ||  || — || December 27, 2006 || Mount Lemmon || Mount Lemmon Survey ||  || align=right data-sort-value="0.85" | 850 m || 
|-id=126 bgcolor=#E9E9E9
| 530126 ||  || — || December 27, 2006 || Mount Lemmon || Mount Lemmon Survey ||  || align=right data-sort-value="0.71" | 710 m || 
|-id=127 bgcolor=#E9E9E9
| 530127 ||  || — || February 8, 2007 || Mount Lemmon || Mount Lemmon Survey ||  || align=right data-sort-value="0.81" | 810 m || 
|-id=128 bgcolor=#E9E9E9
| 530128 ||  || — || January 8, 2011 || Mount Lemmon || Mount Lemmon Survey ||  || align=right data-sort-value="0.81" | 810 m || 
|-id=129 bgcolor=#E9E9E9
| 530129 ||  || — || December 25, 2010 || Mount Lemmon || Mount Lemmon Survey ||  || align=right | 1.1 km || 
|-id=130 bgcolor=#E9E9E9
| 530130 ||  || — || October 14, 2010 || Mount Lemmon || Mount Lemmon Survey ||  || align=right | 1.6 km || 
|-id=131 bgcolor=#E9E9E9
| 530131 ||  || — || November 8, 2010 || Mount Lemmon || Mount Lemmon Survey ||  || align=right data-sort-value="0.69" | 690 m || 
|-id=132 bgcolor=#E9E9E9
| 530132 ||  || — || November 20, 2001 || Socorro || LINEAR ||  || align=right | 1.4 km || 
|-id=133 bgcolor=#fefefe
| 530133 ||  || — || November 7, 2010 || Mount Lemmon || Mount Lemmon Survey || NYS || align=right data-sort-value="0.50" | 500 m || 
|-id=134 bgcolor=#E9E9E9
| 530134 ||  || — || September 17, 2009 || Kitt Peak || Spacewatch ||  || align=right | 1.6 km || 
|-id=135 bgcolor=#E9E9E9
| 530135 ||  || — || January 5, 2011 || Catalina || CSS ||  || align=right | 1.4 km || 
|-id=136 bgcolor=#E9E9E9
| 530136 ||  || — || December 29, 2010 || Catalina || CSS ||  || align=right | 1.7 km || 
|-id=137 bgcolor=#E9E9E9
| 530137 ||  || — || January 11, 2011 || Catalina || CSS ||  || align=right | 1.4 km || 
|-id=138 bgcolor=#E9E9E9
| 530138 ||  || — || March 11, 2007 || Kitt Peak || Spacewatch ||  || align=right | 1.3 km || 
|-id=139 bgcolor=#E9E9E9
| 530139 ||  || — || December 5, 2010 || Mount Lemmon || Mount Lemmon Survey ||  || align=right | 1.0 km || 
|-id=140 bgcolor=#fefefe
| 530140 ||  || — || January 12, 2011 || Kitt Peak || Spacewatch ||  || align=right data-sort-value="0.60" | 600 m || 
|-id=141 bgcolor=#E9E9E9
| 530141 ||  || — || February 23, 2007 || Mount Lemmon || Mount Lemmon Survey ||  || align=right | 1.1 km || 
|-id=142 bgcolor=#E9E9E9
| 530142 ||  || — || February 23, 2007 || Mount Lemmon || Mount Lemmon Survey ||  || align=right | 1.0 km || 
|-id=143 bgcolor=#fefefe
| 530143 ||  || — || January 10, 2011 || Mount Lemmon || Mount Lemmon Survey ||  || align=right data-sort-value="0.77" | 770 m || 
|-id=144 bgcolor=#E9E9E9
| 530144 ||  || — || January 10, 2011 || Kitt Peak || Spacewatch ||  || align=right data-sort-value="0.67" | 670 m || 
|-id=145 bgcolor=#E9E9E9
| 530145 ||  || — || December 10, 2010 || Mount Lemmon || Mount Lemmon Survey ||  || align=right | 1.9 km || 
|-id=146 bgcolor=#E9E9E9
| 530146 ||  || — || December 5, 2010 || Mount Lemmon || Mount Lemmon Survey ||  || align=right | 1.1 km || 
|-id=147 bgcolor=#E9E9E9
| 530147 ||  || — || December 8, 2010 || Mount Lemmon || Mount Lemmon Survey ||  || align=right data-sort-value="0.85" | 850 m || 
|-id=148 bgcolor=#E9E9E9
| 530148 ||  || — || December 9, 2010 || Mount Lemmon || Mount Lemmon Survey ||  || align=right | 1.3 km || 
|-id=149 bgcolor=#fefefe
| 530149 ||  || — || January 14, 2011 || Mount Lemmon || Mount Lemmon Survey ||  || align=right data-sort-value="0.77" | 770 m || 
|-id=150 bgcolor=#fefefe
| 530150 ||  || — || January 14, 2011 || Mount Lemmon || Mount Lemmon Survey ||  || align=right data-sort-value="0.53" | 530 m || 
|-id=151 bgcolor=#FFC2E0
| 530151 ||  || — || January 13, 2011 || Mount Lemmon || Mount Lemmon Survey || APOcritical || align=right data-sort-value="0.28" | 280 m || 
|-id=152 bgcolor=#E9E9E9
| 530152 ||  || — || January 8, 2010 || WISE || WISE ||  || align=right | 2.1 km || 
|-id=153 bgcolor=#fefefe
| 530153 ||  || — || January 14, 2011 || Mount Lemmon || Mount Lemmon Survey ||  || align=right data-sort-value="0.75" | 750 m || 
|-id=154 bgcolor=#E9E9E9
| 530154 ||  || — || December 6, 2010 || Mount Lemmon || Mount Lemmon Survey ||  || align=right | 1.1 km || 
|-id=155 bgcolor=#fefefe
| 530155 ||  || — || December 14, 2010 || Mount Lemmon || Mount Lemmon Survey ||  || align=right data-sort-value="0.68" | 680 m || 
|-id=156 bgcolor=#E9E9E9
| 530156 ||  || — || January 11, 2011 || Kitt Peak || Spacewatch ||  || align=right | 1.5 km || 
|-id=157 bgcolor=#E9E9E9
| 530157 ||  || — || January 11, 2011 || Catalina || CSS || EUN || align=right | 1.1 km || 
|-id=158 bgcolor=#E9E9E9
| 530158 ||  || — || November 18, 2006 || Kitt Peak || Spacewatch ||  || align=right data-sort-value="0.59" | 590 m || 
|-id=159 bgcolor=#fefefe
| 530159 ||  || — || January 3, 2011 || Catalina || CSS || H || align=right data-sort-value="0.61" | 610 m || 
|-id=160 bgcolor=#fefefe
| 530160 ||  || — || January 12, 2011 || Kitt Peak || Spacewatch || H || align=right data-sort-value="0.62" | 620 m || 
|-id=161 bgcolor=#fefefe
| 530161 ||  || — || September 15, 2004 || Socorro || LINEAR || H || align=right data-sort-value="0.89" | 890 m || 
|-id=162 bgcolor=#E9E9E9
| 530162 ||  || — || January 3, 2011 || Mount Lemmon || Mount Lemmon Survey ||  || align=right data-sort-value="0.97" | 970 m || 
|-id=163 bgcolor=#E9E9E9
| 530163 ||  || — || October 1, 2005 || Mount Lemmon || Mount Lemmon Survey ||  || align=right | 1.0 km || 
|-id=164 bgcolor=#E9E9E9
| 530164 ||  || — || January 11, 2011 || Kitt Peak || Spacewatch ||  || align=right data-sort-value="0.98" | 980 m || 
|-id=165 bgcolor=#E9E9E9
| 530165 ||  || — || January 14, 2011 || Kitt Peak || Spacewatch ||  || align=right data-sort-value="0.99" | 990 m || 
|-id=166 bgcolor=#E9E9E9
| 530166 ||  || — || January 14, 2011 || Kitt Peak || Spacewatch ||  || align=right | 1.3 km || 
|-id=167 bgcolor=#E9E9E9
| 530167 ||  || — || December 5, 2010 || Kitt Peak || Spacewatch ||  || align=right | 1.4 km || 
|-id=168 bgcolor=#fefefe
| 530168 ||  || — || January 4, 2011 || Mount Lemmon || Mount Lemmon Survey ||  || align=right data-sort-value="0.71" | 710 m || 
|-id=169 bgcolor=#fefefe
| 530169 ||  || — || December 15, 2006 || Kitt Peak || Spacewatch ||  || align=right data-sort-value="0.52" | 520 m || 
|-id=170 bgcolor=#fefefe
| 530170 ||  || — || January 14, 2011 || Mount Lemmon || Mount Lemmon Survey ||  || align=right data-sort-value="0.69" | 690 m || 
|-id=171 bgcolor=#E9E9E9
| 530171 ||  || — || January 16, 2011 || Mount Lemmon || Mount Lemmon Survey ||  || align=right | 1.1 km || 
|-id=172 bgcolor=#fefefe
| 530172 ||  || — || December 8, 2010 || Mount Lemmon || Mount Lemmon Survey || H || align=right data-sort-value="0.56" | 560 m || 
|-id=173 bgcolor=#E9E9E9
| 530173 ||  || — || January 8, 2011 || Mount Lemmon || Mount Lemmon Survey ||  || align=right | 1.7 km || 
|-id=174 bgcolor=#E9E9E9
| 530174 ||  || — || January 4, 2011 || Mount Lemmon || Mount Lemmon Survey ||  || align=right | 2.7 km || 
|-id=175 bgcolor=#E9E9E9
| 530175 ||  || — || February 17, 2007 || Kitt Peak || Spacewatch ||  || align=right | 1.2 km || 
|-id=176 bgcolor=#E9E9E9
| 530176 ||  || — || September 1, 2005 || Kitt Peak || Spacewatch ||  || align=right | 1.1 km || 
|-id=177 bgcolor=#fefefe
| 530177 ||  || — || January 17, 2011 || Mount Lemmon || Mount Lemmon Survey || H || align=right data-sort-value="0.62" | 620 m || 
|-id=178 bgcolor=#d6d6d6
| 530178 ||  || — || January 17, 2011 || Mount Lemmon || Mount Lemmon Survey || 3:2 || align=right | 5.4 km || 
|-id=179 bgcolor=#E9E9E9
| 530179 ||  || — || July 28, 2009 || Kitt Peak || Spacewatch ||  || align=right | 1.2 km || 
|-id=180 bgcolor=#E9E9E9
| 530180 ||  || — || December 9, 2010 || Mount Lemmon || Mount Lemmon Survey ||  || align=right | 1.8 km || 
|-id=181 bgcolor=#fefefe
| 530181 ||  || — || November 16, 2010 || Mount Lemmon || Mount Lemmon Survey || H || align=right data-sort-value="0.73" | 730 m || 
|-id=182 bgcolor=#E9E9E9
| 530182 ||  || — || January 27, 2011 || Kitt Peak || Spacewatch ||  || align=right | 1.1 km || 
|-id=183 bgcolor=#E9E9E9
| 530183 ||  || — || January 31, 1998 || Kitt Peak || Spacewatch || EUN || align=right | 1.1 km || 
|-id=184 bgcolor=#E9E9E9
| 530184 ||  || — || December 5, 2010 || Mount Lemmon || Mount Lemmon Survey ||  || align=right | 1.1 km || 
|-id=185 bgcolor=#E9E9E9
| 530185 ||  || — || January 28, 2011 || Kitt Peak || Spacewatch ||  || align=right | 2.2 km || 
|-id=186 bgcolor=#E9E9E9
| 530186 ||  || — || January 8, 2011 || Catalina || CSS ||  || align=right | 1.1 km || 
|-id=187 bgcolor=#E9E9E9
| 530187 ||  || — || March 10, 2007 || Mount Lemmon || Mount Lemmon Survey ||  || align=right | 1.2 km || 
|-id=188 bgcolor=#fefefe
| 530188 ||  || — || January 13, 2011 || Kitt Peak || Spacewatch || H || align=right data-sort-value="0.63" | 630 m || 
|-id=189 bgcolor=#E9E9E9
| 530189 ||  || — || October 26, 2005 || Kitt Peak || Spacewatch ||  || align=right | 1.9 km || 
|-id=190 bgcolor=#E9E9E9
| 530190 ||  || — || November 15, 2010 || Mount Lemmon || Mount Lemmon Survey ||  || align=right | 1.3 km || 
|-id=191 bgcolor=#E9E9E9
| 530191 ||  || — || January 25, 2011 || Mount Lemmon || Mount Lemmon Survey ||  || align=right | 1.3 km || 
|-id=192 bgcolor=#E9E9E9
| 530192 ||  || — || February 25, 2007 || Mount Lemmon || Mount Lemmon Survey ||  || align=right | 1.2 km || 
|-id=193 bgcolor=#d6d6d6
| 530193 ||  || — || November 18, 2009 || Kitt Peak || Spacewatch || 3:2 || align=right | 3.5 km || 
|-id=194 bgcolor=#fefefe
| 530194 ||  || — || September 15, 2007 || Catalina || CSS || H || align=right data-sort-value="0.71" | 710 m || 
|-id=195 bgcolor=#fefefe
| 530195 ||  || — || January 16, 2011 || Mount Lemmon || Mount Lemmon Survey || H || align=right data-sort-value="0.62" | 620 m || 
|-id=196 bgcolor=#E9E9E9
| 530196 ||  || — || January 30, 2011 || Haleakala || Pan-STARRS ||  || align=right | 1.5 km || 
|-id=197 bgcolor=#E9E9E9
| 530197 ||  || — || January 30, 2011 || Haleakala || Pan-STARRS ||  || align=right data-sort-value="0.69" | 690 m || 
|-id=198 bgcolor=#E9E9E9
| 530198 ||  || — || January 16, 2011 || Mount Lemmon || Mount Lemmon Survey ||  || align=right | 1.7 km || 
|-id=199 bgcolor=#fefefe
| 530199 ||  || — || January 30, 2011 || Haleakala || Pan-STARRS ||  || align=right data-sort-value="0.89" | 890 m || 
|-id=200 bgcolor=#E9E9E9
| 530200 ||  || — || January 30, 2011 || Haleakala || Pan-STARRS ||  || align=right | 2.3 km || 
|}

530201–530300 

|-bgcolor=#E9E9E9
| 530201 ||  || — || January 30, 2011 || Haleakala || Pan-STARRS ||  || align=right | 2.2 km || 
|-id=202 bgcolor=#E9E9E9
| 530202 ||  || — || December 9, 2010 || Mount Lemmon || Mount Lemmon Survey ||  || align=right | 1.7 km || 
|-id=203 bgcolor=#E9E9E9
| 530203 ||  || — || December 8, 2010 || Mount Lemmon || Mount Lemmon Survey ||  || align=right data-sort-value="0.98" | 980 m || 
|-id=204 bgcolor=#E9E9E9
| 530204 ||  || — || December 26, 2005 || Kitt Peak || Spacewatch ||  || align=right | 2.3 km || 
|-id=205 bgcolor=#fefefe
| 530205 ||  || — || January 3, 2011 || Catalina || CSS || H || align=right data-sort-value="0.54" | 540 m || 
|-id=206 bgcolor=#fefefe
| 530206 ||  || — || January 11, 2011 || Kitt Peak || Spacewatch ||  || align=right | 1.0 km || 
|-id=207 bgcolor=#E9E9E9
| 530207 ||  || — || January 8, 2011 || Mount Lemmon || Mount Lemmon Survey ||  || align=right | 1.4 km || 
|-id=208 bgcolor=#d6d6d6
| 530208 ||  || — || November 7, 2010 || Mount Lemmon || Mount Lemmon Survey || 3:2 || align=right | 2.7 km || 
|-id=209 bgcolor=#fefefe
| 530209 ||  || — || January 28, 2011 || Mount Lemmon || Mount Lemmon Survey ||  || align=right data-sort-value="0.71" | 710 m || 
|-id=210 bgcolor=#E9E9E9
| 530210 ||  || — || December 8, 2010 || Mount Lemmon || Mount Lemmon Survey ||  || align=right | 1.1 km || 
|-id=211 bgcolor=#E9E9E9
| 530211 ||  || — || December 10, 2010 || Mount Lemmon || Mount Lemmon Survey ||  || align=right | 1.1 km || 
|-id=212 bgcolor=#E9E9E9
| 530212 ||  || — || February 21, 2007 || Kitt Peak || Spacewatch ||  || align=right | 1.5 km || 
|-id=213 bgcolor=#E9E9E9
| 530213 ||  || — || January 10, 2007 || Kitt Peak || Spacewatch ||  || align=right data-sort-value="0.62" | 620 m || 
|-id=214 bgcolor=#E9E9E9
| 530214 ||  || — || January 17, 2007 || Kitt Peak || Spacewatch ||  || align=right data-sort-value="0.98" | 980 m || 
|-id=215 bgcolor=#fefefe
| 530215 ||  || — || January 4, 2011 || Mount Lemmon || Mount Lemmon Survey || H || align=right data-sort-value="0.49" | 490 m || 
|-id=216 bgcolor=#fefefe
| 530216 ||  || — || January 27, 2011 || Mount Lemmon || Mount Lemmon Survey || MAS || align=right data-sort-value="0.64" | 640 m || 
|-id=217 bgcolor=#E9E9E9
| 530217 ||  || — || January 8, 2010 || WISE || WISE ||  || align=right | 2.3 km || 
|-id=218 bgcolor=#d6d6d6
| 530218 ||  || — || October 12, 2009 || Mount Lemmon || Mount Lemmon Survey || 3:2 || align=right | 2.7 km || 
|-id=219 bgcolor=#E9E9E9
| 530219 ||  || — || November 10, 2009 || Mount Lemmon || Mount Lemmon Survey ||  || align=right | 1.4 km || 
|-id=220 bgcolor=#fefefe
| 530220 ||  || — || January 14, 2011 || Kitt Peak || Spacewatch || H || align=right data-sort-value="0.59" | 590 m || 
|-id=221 bgcolor=#fefefe
| 530221 ||  || — || January 27, 2011 || Mount Lemmon || Mount Lemmon Survey || NYS || align=right data-sort-value="0.53" | 530 m || 
|-id=222 bgcolor=#E9E9E9
| 530222 ||  || — || January 28, 2011 || Mount Lemmon || Mount Lemmon Survey ||  || align=right | 1.3 km || 
|-id=223 bgcolor=#fefefe
| 530223 ||  || — || January 29, 2011 || Mount Lemmon || Mount Lemmon Survey ||  || align=right data-sort-value="0.76" | 760 m || 
|-id=224 bgcolor=#fefefe
| 530224 ||  || — || January 14, 2011 || Kitt Peak || Spacewatch || NYS || align=right data-sort-value="0.50" | 500 m || 
|-id=225 bgcolor=#E9E9E9
| 530225 ||  || — || January 29, 2011 || Mount Lemmon || Mount Lemmon Survey ||  || align=right | 1.8 km || 
|-id=226 bgcolor=#E9E9E9
| 530226 ||  || — || February 21, 2007 || Mount Lemmon || Mount Lemmon Survey ||  || align=right data-sort-value="0.68" | 680 m || 
|-id=227 bgcolor=#E9E9E9
| 530227 ||  || — || August 15, 2009 || Kitt Peak || Spacewatch ||  || align=right | 1.1 km || 
|-id=228 bgcolor=#E9E9E9
| 530228 ||  || — || February 23, 2007 || Mount Lemmon || Mount Lemmon Survey ||  || align=right | 1.0 km || 
|-id=229 bgcolor=#E9E9E9
| 530229 ||  || — || January 28, 2011 || Mount Lemmon || Mount Lemmon Survey ||  || align=right data-sort-value="0.71" | 710 m || 
|-id=230 bgcolor=#E9E9E9
| 530230 ||  || — || January 28, 2011 || Mount Lemmon || Mount Lemmon Survey ||  || align=right data-sort-value="0.78" | 780 m || 
|-id=231 bgcolor=#C2E0FF
| 530231 ||  || — || January 9, 2010 || Haleakala || Pan-STARRS || cubewano (cold) || align=right | 212 km || 
|-id=232 bgcolor=#d6d6d6
| 530232 ||  || — || March 4, 2010 || WISE || WISE || 3:2 || align=right | 3.3 km || 
|-id=233 bgcolor=#E9E9E9
| 530233 ||  || — || January 28, 2011 || Mount Lemmon || Mount Lemmon Survey ||  || align=right | 1.0 km || 
|-id=234 bgcolor=#E9E9E9
| 530234 ||  || — || November 6, 2005 || Mount Lemmon || Mount Lemmon Survey ||  || align=right | 1.1 km || 
|-id=235 bgcolor=#E9E9E9
| 530235 ||  || — || March 14, 2007 || Mount Lemmon || Mount Lemmon Survey ||  || align=right data-sort-value="0.83" | 830 m || 
|-id=236 bgcolor=#E9E9E9
| 530236 ||  || — || February 21, 2007 || Mount Lemmon || Mount Lemmon Survey ||  || align=right data-sort-value="0.54" | 540 m || 
|-id=237 bgcolor=#E9E9E9
| 530237 ||  || — || January 30, 2011 || Mount Lemmon || Mount Lemmon Survey ||  || align=right | 2.0 km || 
|-id=238 bgcolor=#E9E9E9
| 530238 ||  || — || March 20, 2007 || Mount Lemmon || Mount Lemmon Survey ||  || align=right | 1.7 km || 
|-id=239 bgcolor=#E9E9E9
| 530239 ||  || — || September 29, 2009 || Mount Lemmon || Mount Lemmon Survey ||  || align=right | 1.1 km || 
|-id=240 bgcolor=#fefefe
| 530240 ||  || — || January 27, 2007 || Mount Lemmon || Mount Lemmon Survey ||  || align=right data-sort-value="0.70" | 700 m || 
|-id=241 bgcolor=#E9E9E9
| 530241 ||  || — || October 28, 2005 || Kitt Peak || Spacewatch ||  || align=right | 1.1 km || 
|-id=242 bgcolor=#E9E9E9
| 530242 ||  || — || March 9, 2007 || Kitt Peak || Spacewatch ||  || align=right | 1.2 km || 
|-id=243 bgcolor=#E9E9E9
| 530243 ||  || — || January 16, 2011 || Mount Lemmon || Mount Lemmon Survey ||  || align=right | 1.1 km || 
|-id=244 bgcolor=#fefefe
| 530244 ||  || — || January 23, 2011 || Mount Lemmon || Mount Lemmon Survey ||  || align=right data-sort-value="0.67" | 670 m || 
|-id=245 bgcolor=#E9E9E9
| 530245 ||  || — || January 26, 2011 || Mount Lemmon || Mount Lemmon Survey ||  || align=right data-sort-value="0.69" | 690 m || 
|-id=246 bgcolor=#E9E9E9
| 530246 ||  || — || January 27, 2011 || Mount Lemmon || Mount Lemmon Survey ||  || align=right | 1.7 km || 
|-id=247 bgcolor=#d6d6d6
| 530247 ||  || — || January 28, 2011 || Mount Lemmon || Mount Lemmon Survey ||  || align=right | 3.0 km || 
|-id=248 bgcolor=#E9E9E9
| 530248 ||  || — || January 30, 2011 || Haleakala || Pan-STARRS ||  || align=right | 1.7 km || 
|-id=249 bgcolor=#E9E9E9
| 530249 ||  || — || September 22, 2009 || Mount Lemmon || Mount Lemmon Survey ||  || align=right | 1.6 km || 
|-id=250 bgcolor=#E9E9E9
| 530250 ||  || — || January 30, 2011 || Haleakala || Pan-STARRS ||  || align=right | 1.7 km || 
|-id=251 bgcolor=#E9E9E9
| 530251 ||  || — || January 30, 2011 || Mount Lemmon || Mount Lemmon Survey ||  || align=right data-sort-value="0.89" | 890 m || 
|-id=252 bgcolor=#E9E9E9
| 530252 ||  || — || January 30, 2011 || Haleakala || Pan-STARRS ||  || align=right | 1.4 km || 
|-id=253 bgcolor=#E9E9E9
| 530253 ||  || — || January 25, 2011 || Mount Lemmon || Mount Lemmon Survey ||  || align=right data-sort-value="0.78" | 780 m || 
|-id=254 bgcolor=#fefefe
| 530254 ||  || — || November 25, 2006 || Kitt Peak || Spacewatch ||  || align=right data-sort-value="0.65" | 650 m || 
|-id=255 bgcolor=#E9E9E9
| 530255 ||  || — || November 3, 2010 || Mount Lemmon || Mount Lemmon Survey ||  || align=right | 1.0 km || 
|-id=256 bgcolor=#E9E9E9
| 530256 ||  || — || January 28, 2011 || Mount Lemmon || Mount Lemmon Survey ||  || align=right data-sort-value="0.70" | 700 m || 
|-id=257 bgcolor=#fefefe
| 530257 ||  || — || January 28, 2007 || Mount Lemmon || Mount Lemmon Survey ||  || align=right data-sort-value="0.62" | 620 m || 
|-id=258 bgcolor=#fefefe
| 530258 ||  || — || January 30, 2011 || Haleakala || Pan-STARRS ||  || align=right data-sort-value="0.75" | 750 m || 
|-id=259 bgcolor=#E9E9E9
| 530259 ||  || — || January 27, 2011 || Mount Lemmon || Mount Lemmon Survey ||  || align=right | 2.3 km || 
|-id=260 bgcolor=#fefefe
| 530260 ||  || — || January 13, 2011 || Kitt Peak || Spacewatch ||  || align=right data-sort-value="0.63" | 630 m || 
|-id=261 bgcolor=#fefefe
| 530261 ||  || — || January 30, 2011 || Haleakala || Pan-STARRS ||  || align=right data-sort-value="0.77" | 770 m || 
|-id=262 bgcolor=#E9E9E9
| 530262 ||  || — || January 28, 2011 || Mount Lemmon || Mount Lemmon Survey ||  || align=right | 1.8 km || 
|-id=263 bgcolor=#E9E9E9
| 530263 ||  || — || January 12, 2011 || Kitt Peak || Spacewatch ||  || align=right | 1.4 km || 
|-id=264 bgcolor=#fefefe
| 530264 ||  || — || January 13, 2011 || Kitt Peak || Spacewatch ||  || align=right data-sort-value="0.78" | 780 m || 
|-id=265 bgcolor=#E9E9E9
| 530265 ||  || — || January 30, 2011 || Haleakala || Pan-STARRS ||  || align=right | 2.0 km || 
|-id=266 bgcolor=#fefefe
| 530266 ||  || — || December 8, 2010 || Mount Lemmon || Mount Lemmon Survey || H || align=right data-sort-value="0.61" | 610 m || 
|-id=267 bgcolor=#E9E9E9
| 530267 ||  || — || March 20, 2007 || Mount Lemmon || Mount Lemmon Survey ||  || align=right data-sort-value="0.83" | 830 m || 
|-id=268 bgcolor=#fefefe
| 530268 ||  || — || December 27, 2006 || Mount Lemmon || Mount Lemmon Survey ||  || align=right data-sort-value="0.62" | 620 m || 
|-id=269 bgcolor=#E9E9E9
| 530269 ||  || — || January 30, 2011 || Haleakala || Pan-STARRS ||  || align=right | 1.4 km || 
|-id=270 bgcolor=#fefefe
| 530270 ||  || — || January 3, 2011 || Mount Lemmon || Mount Lemmon Survey ||  || align=right data-sort-value="0.75" | 750 m || 
|-id=271 bgcolor=#E9E9E9
| 530271 ||  || — || October 10, 2005 || Anderson Mesa || LONEOS ||  || align=right | 1.4 km || 
|-id=272 bgcolor=#E9E9E9
| 530272 ||  || — || February 5, 2011 || Mount Lemmon || Mount Lemmon Survey ||  || align=right | 1.2 km || 
|-id=273 bgcolor=#E9E9E9
| 530273 ||  || — || February 27, 2007 || Kitt Peak || Spacewatch ||  || align=right | 1.3 km || 
|-id=274 bgcolor=#fefefe
| 530274 ||  || — || January 11, 2011 || Kitt Peak || Spacewatch || H || align=right data-sort-value="0.74" | 740 m || 
|-id=275 bgcolor=#E9E9E9
| 530275 ||  || — || February 7, 2011 || Mount Lemmon || Mount Lemmon Survey ||  || align=right data-sort-value="0.81" | 810 m || 
|-id=276 bgcolor=#d6d6d6
| 530276 ||  || — || December 10, 2009 || Mount Lemmon || Mount Lemmon Survey || 3:2 || align=right | 3.2 km || 
|-id=277 bgcolor=#fefefe
| 530277 ||  || — || January 16, 2011 || Mount Lemmon || Mount Lemmon Survey ||  || align=right data-sort-value="0.80" | 800 m || 
|-id=278 bgcolor=#E9E9E9
| 530278 ||  || — || November 12, 2001 || Socorro || LINEAR || (1547) || align=right | 1.3 km || 
|-id=279 bgcolor=#E9E9E9
| 530279 ||  || — || January 30, 2011 || Haleakala || Pan-STARRS ||  || align=right data-sort-value="0.61" | 610 m || 
|-id=280 bgcolor=#E9E9E9
| 530280 ||  || — || January 30, 2011 || Haleakala || Pan-STARRS ||  || align=right | 1.9 km || 
|-id=281 bgcolor=#E9E9E9
| 530281 ||  || — || February 7, 2011 || Catalina || CSS ||  || align=right | 1.1 km || 
|-id=282 bgcolor=#fefefe
| 530282 ||  || — || December 29, 2010 || Catalina || CSS || H || align=right data-sort-value="0.70" | 700 m || 
|-id=283 bgcolor=#fefefe
| 530283 ||  || — || January 30, 2011 || Haleakala || Pan-STARRS ||  || align=right data-sort-value="0.78" | 780 m || 
|-id=284 bgcolor=#fefefe
| 530284 ||  || — || January 4, 2011 || Mount Lemmon || Mount Lemmon Survey || H || align=right data-sort-value="0.78" | 780 m || 
|-id=285 bgcolor=#E9E9E9
| 530285 ||  || — || January 10, 2011 || Mount Lemmon || Mount Lemmon Survey ||  || align=right | 1.2 km || 
|-id=286 bgcolor=#fefefe
| 530286 ||  || — || December 29, 2010 || Catalina || CSS || H || align=right data-sort-value="0.65" | 650 m || 
|-id=287 bgcolor=#E9E9E9
| 530287 ||  || — || January 26, 2011 || Kitt Peak || Spacewatch ||  || align=right | 2.1 km || 
|-id=288 bgcolor=#d6d6d6
| 530288 ||  || — || February 7, 2010 || WISE || WISE || 3:2 || align=right | 4.1 km || 
|-id=289 bgcolor=#E9E9E9
| 530289 ||  || — || September 29, 2009 || Mount Lemmon || Mount Lemmon Survey ||  || align=right | 1.2 km || 
|-id=290 bgcolor=#fefefe
| 530290 ||  || — || January 30, 2011 || Haleakala || Pan-STARRS ||  || align=right data-sort-value="0.65" | 650 m || 
|-id=291 bgcolor=#fefefe
| 530291 ||  || — || January 27, 2011 || Mount Lemmon || Mount Lemmon Survey ||  || align=right data-sort-value="0.85" | 850 m || 
|-id=292 bgcolor=#d6d6d6
| 530292 ||  || — || January 7, 2006 || Kitt Peak || Spacewatch || BRA || align=right | 1.3 km || 
|-id=293 bgcolor=#fefefe
| 530293 ||  || — || February 10, 2011 || Catalina || CSS || H || align=right data-sort-value="0.74" | 740 m || 
|-id=294 bgcolor=#E9E9E9
| 530294 ||  || — || January 30, 2011 || Haleakala || Pan-STARRS ||  || align=right data-sort-value="0.56" | 560 m || 
|-id=295 bgcolor=#E9E9E9
| 530295 ||  || — || January 30, 2011 || Haleakala || Pan-STARRS ||  || align=right data-sort-value="0.75" | 750 m || 
|-id=296 bgcolor=#fefefe
| 530296 ||  || — || January 29, 2011 || Kitt Peak || Spacewatch ||  || align=right data-sort-value="0.85" | 850 m || 
|-id=297 bgcolor=#E9E9E9
| 530297 ||  || — || April 25, 2003 || Kitt Peak || Spacewatch ||  || align=right data-sort-value="0.87" | 870 m || 
|-id=298 bgcolor=#fefefe
| 530298 ||  || — || January 4, 2011 || Mount Lemmon || Mount Lemmon Survey || H || align=right data-sort-value="0.65" | 650 m || 
|-id=299 bgcolor=#E9E9E9
| 530299 ||  || — || January 4, 2011 || Mount Lemmon || Mount Lemmon Survey ||  || align=right | 1.1 km || 
|-id=300 bgcolor=#E9E9E9
| 530300 ||  || — || January 29, 2007 || Kitt Peak || Spacewatch ||  || align=right data-sort-value="0.96" | 960 m || 
|}

530301–530400 

|-bgcolor=#fefefe
| 530301 ||  || — || January 30, 2011 || Haleakala || Pan-STARRS ||  || align=right data-sort-value="0.79" | 790 m || 
|-id=302 bgcolor=#E9E9E9
| 530302 ||  || — || January 30, 2011 || Haleakala || Pan-STARRS || MAR || align=right data-sort-value="0.78" | 780 m || 
|-id=303 bgcolor=#E9E9E9
| 530303 ||  || — || May 11, 2003 || Kitt Peak || Spacewatch ||  || align=right | 1.0 km || 
|-id=304 bgcolor=#E9E9E9
| 530304 ||  || — || November 25, 2005 || Mount Lemmon || Mount Lemmon Survey ||  || align=right data-sort-value="0.99" | 990 m || 
|-id=305 bgcolor=#E9E9E9
| 530305 ||  || — || January 30, 2011 || Haleakala || Pan-STARRS ||  || align=right | 1.00 km || 
|-id=306 bgcolor=#E9E9E9
| 530306 ||  || — || January 30, 2011 || Haleakala || Pan-STARRS ||  || align=right | 1.8 km || 
|-id=307 bgcolor=#E9E9E9
| 530307 ||  || — || January 4, 2006 || Kitt Peak || Spacewatch ||  || align=right | 1.6 km || 
|-id=308 bgcolor=#E9E9E9
| 530308 ||  || — || February 10, 2011 || Mount Lemmon || Mount Lemmon Survey ||  || align=right data-sort-value="0.74" | 740 m || 
|-id=309 bgcolor=#E9E9E9
| 530309 ||  || — || March 12, 2007 || Catalina || CSS ||  || align=right | 1.7 km || 
|-id=310 bgcolor=#d6d6d6
| 530310 ||  || — || February 22, 2011 || Kitt Peak || Spacewatch ||  || align=right | 3.1 km || 
|-id=311 bgcolor=#E9E9E9
| 530311 ||  || — || January 26, 2011 || Kitt Peak || Spacewatch ||  || align=right | 1.5 km || 
|-id=312 bgcolor=#E9E9E9
| 530312 ||  || — || January 30, 2011 || Kitt Peak || Spacewatch ||  || align=right | 1.1 km || 
|-id=313 bgcolor=#fefefe
| 530313 ||  || — || September 10, 2004 || Kitt Peak || Spacewatch || H || align=right data-sort-value="0.55" | 550 m || 
|-id=314 bgcolor=#E9E9E9
| 530314 ||  || — || October 26, 2005 || Anderson Mesa || LONEOS ||  || align=right | 1.9 km || 
|-id=315 bgcolor=#fefefe
| 530315 ||  || — || August 23, 2004 || Kitt Peak || Spacewatch || H || align=right data-sort-value="0.49" | 490 m || 
|-id=316 bgcolor=#E9E9E9
| 530316 ||  || — || March 16, 2007 || Kitt Peak || Spacewatch ||  || align=right | 1.1 km || 
|-id=317 bgcolor=#d6d6d6
| 530317 ||  || — || November 16, 2009 || Mount Lemmon || Mount Lemmon Survey || 3:2 || align=right | 3.1 km || 
|-id=318 bgcolor=#d6d6d6
| 530318 ||  || — || September 2, 2008 || La Sagra || OAM Obs. ||  || align=right | 3.9 km || 
|-id=319 bgcolor=#E9E9E9
| 530319 ||  || — || September 23, 2009 || Kitt Peak || Spacewatch ||  || align=right | 1.5 km || 
|-id=320 bgcolor=#E9E9E9
| 530320 ||  || — || January 27, 2007 || Kitt Peak || Spacewatch ||  || align=right data-sort-value="0.89" | 890 m || 
|-id=321 bgcolor=#E9E9E9
| 530321 ||  || — || January 30, 2011 || Haleakala || Pan-STARRS ||  || align=right | 1.2 km || 
|-id=322 bgcolor=#E9E9E9
| 530322 ||  || — || March 9, 2007 || Kitt Peak || Spacewatch ||  || align=right data-sort-value="0.64" | 640 m || 
|-id=323 bgcolor=#E9E9E9
| 530323 ||  || — || February 25, 2011 || Mount Lemmon || Mount Lemmon Survey ||  || align=right | 1.2 km || 
|-id=324 bgcolor=#E9E9E9
| 530324 ||  || — || January 26, 2011 || Kitt Peak || Spacewatch ||  || align=right | 1.1 km || 
|-id=325 bgcolor=#E9E9E9
| 530325 ||  || — || December 30, 2005 || Kitt Peak || Spacewatch ||  || align=right | 2.2 km || 
|-id=326 bgcolor=#E9E9E9
| 530326 ||  || — || January 6, 2006 || Mount Lemmon || Mount Lemmon Survey || AGN || align=right | 1.0 km || 
|-id=327 bgcolor=#fefefe
| 530327 ||  || — || February 10, 2011 || Catalina || CSS || H || align=right data-sort-value="0.54" | 540 m || 
|-id=328 bgcolor=#E9E9E9
| 530328 ||  || — || February 25, 2011 || Kitt Peak || Spacewatch ||  || align=right | 2.1 km || 
|-id=329 bgcolor=#E9E9E9
| 530329 ||  || — || February 25, 2011 || Kitt Peak || Spacewatch ||  || align=right data-sort-value="0.78" | 780 m || 
|-id=330 bgcolor=#fefefe
| 530330 ||  || — || June 2, 2008 || Mount Lemmon || Mount Lemmon Survey ||  || align=right data-sort-value="0.78" | 780 m || 
|-id=331 bgcolor=#E9E9E9
| 530331 ||  || — || January 28, 2011 || Mount Lemmon || Mount Lemmon Survey ||  || align=right | 1.4 km || 
|-id=332 bgcolor=#E9E9E9
| 530332 ||  || — || February 10, 2011 || Mount Lemmon || Mount Lemmon Survey ||  || align=right data-sort-value="0.64" | 640 m || 
|-id=333 bgcolor=#E9E9E9
| 530333 ||  || — || January 30, 2011 || Haleakala || Pan-STARRS ||  || align=right data-sort-value="0.75" | 750 m || 
|-id=334 bgcolor=#fefefe
| 530334 ||  || — || March 1, 2011 || Mount Lemmon || Mount Lemmon Survey || H || align=right data-sort-value="0.66" | 660 m || 
|-id=335 bgcolor=#E9E9E9
| 530335 ||  || — || September 17, 2009 || Mount Lemmon || Mount Lemmon Survey ||  || align=right | 1.3 km || 
|-id=336 bgcolor=#FA8072
| 530336 ||  || — || September 14, 2005 || Kitt Peak || Spacewatch ||  || align=right | 1.2 km || 
|-id=337 bgcolor=#E9E9E9
| 530337 ||  || — || September 20, 2009 || Mount Lemmon || Mount Lemmon Survey ||  || align=right | 1.3 km || 
|-id=338 bgcolor=#E9E9E9
| 530338 ||  || — || January 8, 2011 || Mount Lemmon || Mount Lemmon Survey ||  || align=right | 1.7 km || 
|-id=339 bgcolor=#fefefe
| 530339 ||  || — || July 30, 2009 || Kitt Peak || Spacewatch || H || align=right data-sort-value="0.45" | 450 m || 
|-id=340 bgcolor=#E9E9E9
| 530340 ||  || — || January 29, 2011 || Kitt Peak || Spacewatch ||  || align=right data-sort-value="0.64" | 640 m || 
|-id=341 bgcolor=#E9E9E9
| 530341 ||  || — || January 30, 2011 || Kitt Peak || Spacewatch ||  || align=right data-sort-value="0.91" | 910 m || 
|-id=342 bgcolor=#E9E9E9
| 530342 ||  || — || March 15, 2007 || Mount Lemmon || Mount Lemmon Survey ||  || align=right data-sort-value="0.71" | 710 m || 
|-id=343 bgcolor=#E9E9E9
| 530343 ||  || — || March 6, 2011 || Mount Lemmon || Mount Lemmon Survey ||  || align=right | 1.2 km || 
|-id=344 bgcolor=#E9E9E9
| 530344 ||  || — || March 10, 2007 || Kitt Peak || Spacewatch ||  || align=right | 1.4 km || 
|-id=345 bgcolor=#E9E9E9
| 530345 ||  || — || January 29, 2011 || Kitt Peak || Spacewatch ||  || align=right | 1.8 km || 
|-id=346 bgcolor=#fefefe
| 530346 ||  || — || March 8, 2011 || Catalina || CSS || H || align=right data-sort-value="0.82" | 820 m || 
|-id=347 bgcolor=#E9E9E9
| 530347 ||  || — || February 3, 2010 || WISE || WISE ||  || align=right | 1.8 km || 
|-id=348 bgcolor=#E9E9E9
| 530348 ||  || — || March 6, 2011 || Kitt Peak || Spacewatch ||  || align=right | 1.1 km || 
|-id=349 bgcolor=#E9E9E9
| 530349 ||  || — || January 28, 2011 || Kitt Peak || Spacewatch ||  || align=right | 1.2 km || 
|-id=350 bgcolor=#E9E9E9
| 530350 ||  || — || January 20, 2010 || WISE || WISE ||  || align=right | 1.6 km || 
|-id=351 bgcolor=#FA8072
| 530351 ||  || — || March 25, 2007 || Mount Lemmon || Mount Lemmon Survey ||  || align=right | 1.2 km || 
|-id=352 bgcolor=#E9E9E9
| 530352 ||  || — || February 25, 2011 || Kitt Peak || Spacewatch ||  || align=right data-sort-value="0.82" | 820 m || 
|-id=353 bgcolor=#E9E9E9
| 530353 ||  || — || November 27, 2009 || Mount Lemmon || Mount Lemmon Survey ||  || align=right | 1.9 km || 
|-id=354 bgcolor=#E9E9E9
| 530354 ||  || — || April 20, 2007 || Kitt Peak || Spacewatch ||  || align=right data-sort-value="0.69" | 690 m || 
|-id=355 bgcolor=#E9E9E9
| 530355 ||  || — || February 25, 2011 || Kitt Peak || Spacewatch ||  || align=right | 1.3 km || 
|-id=356 bgcolor=#E9E9E9
| 530356 ||  || — || March 11, 2011 || Kitt Peak || Spacewatch ||  || align=right data-sort-value="0.68" | 680 m || 
|-id=357 bgcolor=#E9E9E9
| 530357 ||  || — || December 27, 2005 || Mount Lemmon || Mount Lemmon Survey ||  || align=right | 2.2 km || 
|-id=358 bgcolor=#E9E9E9
| 530358 ||  || — || December 12, 2010 || Kitt Peak || Spacewatch ||  || align=right | 1.1 km || 
|-id=359 bgcolor=#E9E9E9
| 530359 ||  || — || October 27, 2005 || Kitt Peak || Spacewatch ||  || align=right data-sort-value="0.90" | 900 m || 
|-id=360 bgcolor=#E9E9E9
| 530360 ||  || — || March 10, 2011 || Kitt Peak || Spacewatch ||  || align=right | 1.8 km || 
|-id=361 bgcolor=#E9E9E9
| 530361 ||  || — || February 8, 2011 || Mount Lemmon || Mount Lemmon Survey ||  || align=right | 1.9 km || 
|-id=362 bgcolor=#E9E9E9
| 530362 ||  || — || April 18, 2007 || Mount Lemmon || Mount Lemmon Survey ||  || align=right | 1.1 km || 
|-id=363 bgcolor=#fefefe
| 530363 ||  || — || February 26, 2011 || Catalina || CSS || H || align=right data-sort-value="0.64" | 640 m || 
|-id=364 bgcolor=#E9E9E9
| 530364 ||  || — || January 9, 2011 || Mount Lemmon || Mount Lemmon Survey ||  || align=right | 1.2 km || 
|-id=365 bgcolor=#E9E9E9
| 530365 ||  || — || February 5, 2011 || Mount Lemmon || Mount Lemmon Survey ||  || align=right | 1.7 km || 
|-id=366 bgcolor=#E9E9E9
| 530366 ||  || — || March 6, 2011 || Mount Lemmon || Mount Lemmon Survey ||  || align=right | 1.3 km || 
|-id=367 bgcolor=#d6d6d6
| 530367 ||  || — || September 5, 2007 || Catalina || CSS ||  || align=right | 4.0 km || 
|-id=368 bgcolor=#E9E9E9
| 530368 ||  || — || March 14, 2011 || Mount Lemmon || Mount Lemmon Survey ||  || align=right data-sort-value="0.78" | 780 m || 
|-id=369 bgcolor=#E9E9E9
| 530369 ||  || — || March 13, 2011 || Kitt Peak || Spacewatch ||  || align=right data-sort-value="0.70" | 700 m || 
|-id=370 bgcolor=#E9E9E9
| 530370 ||  || — || March 1, 2011 || Mount Lemmon || Mount Lemmon Survey ||  || align=right data-sort-value="0.57" | 570 m || 
|-id=371 bgcolor=#E9E9E9
| 530371 ||  || — || September 19, 2009 || Kitt Peak || Spacewatch ||  || align=right | 2.3 km || 
|-id=372 bgcolor=#fefefe
| 530372 ||  || — || November 9, 1999 || Socorro || LINEAR || H || align=right data-sort-value="0.60" | 600 m || 
|-id=373 bgcolor=#fefefe
| 530373 ||  || — || September 10, 2004 || Kitt Peak || Spacewatch || H || align=right data-sort-value="0.56" | 560 m || 
|-id=374 bgcolor=#E9E9E9
| 530374 ||  || — || March 5, 2011 || Kitt Peak || Spacewatch ||  || align=right data-sort-value="0.70" | 700 m || 
|-id=375 bgcolor=#E9E9E9
| 530375 ||  || — || March 26, 2011 || Kitt Peak || Spacewatch ||  || align=right | 1.9 km || 
|-id=376 bgcolor=#E9E9E9
| 530376 ||  || — || March 1, 2011 || Mount Lemmon || Mount Lemmon Survey ||  || align=right data-sort-value="0.94" | 940 m || 
|-id=377 bgcolor=#d6d6d6
| 530377 ||  || — || March 27, 2011 || Mount Lemmon || Mount Lemmon Survey ||  || align=right | 2.1 km || 
|-id=378 bgcolor=#E9E9E9
| 530378 ||  || — || September 23, 2008 || Mount Lemmon || Mount Lemmon Survey ||  || align=right | 1.8 km || 
|-id=379 bgcolor=#E9E9E9
| 530379 ||  || — || November 21, 2009 || Kitt Peak || Spacewatch ||  || align=right | 1.9 km || 
|-id=380 bgcolor=#E9E9E9
| 530380 ||  || — || October 22, 2009 || Mount Lemmon || Mount Lemmon Survey ||  || align=right | 1.7 km || 
|-id=381 bgcolor=#E9E9E9
| 530381 ||  || — || January 16, 2011 || Mount Lemmon || Mount Lemmon Survey || BAR || align=right | 1.1 km || 
|-id=382 bgcolor=#E9E9E9
| 530382 ||  || — || March 28, 2011 || Kitt Peak || Spacewatch ||  || align=right | 1.3 km || 
|-id=383 bgcolor=#E9E9E9
| 530383 ||  || — || January 26, 2011 || Mount Lemmon || Mount Lemmon Survey ||  || align=right | 1.8 km || 
|-id=384 bgcolor=#E9E9E9
| 530384 ||  || — || March 27, 2011 || Kitt Peak || Spacewatch ||  || align=right | 1.2 km || 
|-id=385 bgcolor=#E9E9E9
| 530385 ||  || — || April 15, 2007 || Catalina || CSS ||  || align=right data-sort-value="0.98" | 980 m || 
|-id=386 bgcolor=#E9E9E9
| 530386 ||  || — || May 1, 2003 || Kitt Peak || Spacewatch ||  || align=right data-sort-value="0.86" | 860 m || 
|-id=387 bgcolor=#E9E9E9
| 530387 ||  || — || March 29, 2011 || Kitt Peak || Spacewatch ||  || align=right data-sort-value="0.94" | 940 m || 
|-id=388 bgcolor=#fefefe
| 530388 ||  || — || February 11, 2011 || Kitt Peak || Spacewatch || H || align=right data-sort-value="0.72" | 720 m || 
|-id=389 bgcolor=#E9E9E9
| 530389 ||  || — || March 30, 2011 || Mount Lemmon || Mount Lemmon Survey ||  || align=right | 1.4 km || 
|-id=390 bgcolor=#E9E9E9
| 530390 ||  || — || March 25, 2011 || Haleakala || Pan-STARRS ||  || align=right | 2.1 km || 
|-id=391 bgcolor=#E9E9E9
| 530391 ||  || — || March 10, 2011 || Kitt Peak || Spacewatch ||  || align=right | 1.1 km || 
|-id=392 bgcolor=#d6d6d6
| 530392 ||  || — || March 31, 2011 || Kitt Peak || Spacewatch || Tj (2.92) || align=right | 4.4 km || 
|-id=393 bgcolor=#E9E9E9
| 530393 ||  || — || March 2, 2011 || Kitt Peak || Spacewatch ||  || align=right data-sort-value="0.83" | 830 m || 
|-id=394 bgcolor=#E9E9E9
| 530394 ||  || — || March 2, 2011 || Kitt Peak || Spacewatch ||  || align=right | 1.8 km || 
|-id=395 bgcolor=#E9E9E9
| 530395 ||  || — || March 6, 2011 || Kitt Peak || Spacewatch || HNS || align=right data-sort-value="0.96" | 960 m || 
|-id=396 bgcolor=#d6d6d6
| 530396 ||  || — || April 9, 2010 || WISE || WISE || Tj (2.99) || align=right | 4.0 km || 
|-id=397 bgcolor=#fefefe
| 530397 ||  || — || September 26, 2009 || Mount Lemmon || Mount Lemmon Survey || H || align=right data-sort-value="0.75" | 750 m || 
|-id=398 bgcolor=#E9E9E9
| 530398 ||  || — || November 10, 2009 || Kitt Peak || Spacewatch ||  || align=right | 1.5 km || 
|-id=399 bgcolor=#E9E9E9
| 530399 ||  || — || September 18, 2009 || Mount Lemmon || Mount Lemmon Survey ||  || align=right | 1.2 km || 
|-id=400 bgcolor=#E9E9E9
| 530400 ||  || — || October 30, 2005 || Kitt Peak || Spacewatch ||  || align=right data-sort-value="0.68" | 680 m || 
|}

530401–530500 

|-bgcolor=#E9E9E9
| 530401 ||  || — || March 29, 2011 || Siding Spring || SSS ||  || align=right | 1.7 km || 
|-id=402 bgcolor=#fefefe
| 530402 ||  || — || March 29, 2011 || Mount Lemmon || Mount Lemmon Survey || H || align=right data-sort-value="0.54" | 540 m || 
|-id=403 bgcolor=#E9E9E9
| 530403 ||  || — || March 25, 2011 || Haleakala || Pan-STARRS ||  || align=right | 2.0 km || 
|-id=404 bgcolor=#E9E9E9
| 530404 ||  || — || January 19, 2010 || WISE || WISE ||  || align=right | 1.3 km || 
|-id=405 bgcolor=#d6d6d6
| 530405 ||  || — || September 5, 2008 || Kitt Peak || Spacewatch ||  || align=right | 2.8 km || 
|-id=406 bgcolor=#E9E9E9
| 530406 ||  || — || September 16, 2004 || Kitt Peak || Spacewatch ||  || align=right | 1.6 km || 
|-id=407 bgcolor=#E9E9E9
| 530407 ||  || — || March 25, 2011 || Kitt Peak || Spacewatch ||  || align=right data-sort-value="0.99" | 990 m || 
|-id=408 bgcolor=#E9E9E9
| 530408 ||  || — || April 25, 2007 || Mount Lemmon || Mount Lemmon Survey ||  || align=right | 1.4 km || 
|-id=409 bgcolor=#E9E9E9
| 530409 ||  || — || March 9, 2011 || Mount Lemmon || Mount Lemmon Survey ||  || align=right data-sort-value="0.96" | 960 m || 
|-id=410 bgcolor=#E9E9E9
| 530410 ||  || — || March 29, 2011 || Haleakala || Pan-STARRS ||  || align=right | 1.3 km || 
|-id=411 bgcolor=#E9E9E9
| 530411 ||  || — || March 27, 2011 || Catalina || CSS ||  || align=right | 2.1 km || 
|-id=412 bgcolor=#fefefe
| 530412 ||  || — || March 31, 2011 || Haleakala || Pan-STARRS || H || align=right data-sort-value="0.54" | 540 m || 
|-id=413 bgcolor=#E9E9E9
| 530413 ||  || — || February 25, 2011 || Mount Lemmon || Mount Lemmon Survey ||  || align=right data-sort-value="0.97" | 970 m || 
|-id=414 bgcolor=#E9E9E9
| 530414 ||  || — || October 18, 2009 || Mount Lemmon || Mount Lemmon Survey ||  || align=right | 1.3 km || 
|-id=415 bgcolor=#E9E9E9
| 530415 ||  || — || April 11, 2010 || WISE || WISE ||  || align=right | 3.9 km || 
|-id=416 bgcolor=#E9E9E9
| 530416 ||  || — || March 11, 2011 || Kitt Peak || Spacewatch ||  || align=right | 1.2 km || 
|-id=417 bgcolor=#E9E9E9
| 530417 ||  || — || March 11, 2011 || Mount Lemmon || Mount Lemmon Survey ||  || align=right data-sort-value="0.72" | 720 m || 
|-id=418 bgcolor=#E9E9E9
| 530418 ||  || — || March 31, 2011 || Haleakala || Pan-STARRS ||  || align=right | 2.3 km || 
|-id=419 bgcolor=#E9E9E9
| 530419 ||  || — || October 24, 2005 || Kitt Peak || Spacewatch ||  || align=right data-sort-value="0.70" | 700 m || 
|-id=420 bgcolor=#E9E9E9
| 530420 ||  || — || April 1, 2011 || Kitt Peak || Spacewatch ||  || align=right | 1.1 km || 
|-id=421 bgcolor=#E9E9E9
| 530421 ||  || — || November 17, 2009 || Mount Lemmon || Mount Lemmon Survey ||  || align=right | 1.4 km || 
|-id=422 bgcolor=#E9E9E9
| 530422 ||  || — || March 13, 2011 || Mount Lemmon || Mount Lemmon Survey ||  || align=right | 1.3 km || 
|-id=423 bgcolor=#E9E9E9
| 530423 ||  || — || September 7, 2008 || Mount Lemmon || Mount Lemmon Survey ||  || align=right data-sort-value="0.90" | 900 m || 
|-id=424 bgcolor=#E9E9E9
| 530424 ||  || — || April 25, 2007 || Mount Lemmon || Mount Lemmon Survey ||  || align=right data-sort-value="0.76" | 760 m || 
|-id=425 bgcolor=#E9E9E9
| 530425 ||  || — || November 20, 2001 || Socorro || LINEAR ||  || align=right data-sort-value="0.92" | 920 m || 
|-id=426 bgcolor=#E9E9E9
| 530426 ||  || — || January 14, 2011 || Mount Lemmon || Mount Lemmon Survey || EUN || align=right | 1.1 km || 
|-id=427 bgcolor=#E9E9E9
| 530427 ||  || — || May 27, 2003 || Kitt Peak || Spacewatch ||  || align=right data-sort-value="0.64" | 640 m || 
|-id=428 bgcolor=#E9E9E9
| 530428 ||  || — || January 17, 2011 || Mount Lemmon || Mount Lemmon Survey ||  || align=right | 1.9 km || 
|-id=429 bgcolor=#fefefe
| 530429 ||  || — || March 14, 2011 || Kitt Peak || Spacewatch || H || align=right data-sort-value="0.64" | 640 m || 
|-id=430 bgcolor=#E9E9E9
| 530430 ||  || — || April 13, 2011 || Mount Lemmon || Mount Lemmon Survey ||  || align=right | 1.2 km || 
|-id=431 bgcolor=#FA8072
| 530431 ||  || — || March 9, 2011 || Haleakala || Pan-STARRS || H || align=right data-sort-value="0.47" | 470 m || 
|-id=432 bgcolor=#E9E9E9
| 530432 ||  || — || April 12, 2011 || Mount Lemmon || Mount Lemmon Survey ||  || align=right data-sort-value="0.71" | 710 m || 
|-id=433 bgcolor=#E9E9E9
| 530433 ||  || — || April 13, 2011 || Haleakala || Pan-STARRS ||  || align=right | 2.0 km || 
|-id=434 bgcolor=#E9E9E9
| 530434 ||  || — || January 8, 2006 || Mount Lemmon || Mount Lemmon Survey ||  || align=right data-sort-value="0.79" | 790 m || 
|-id=435 bgcolor=#E9E9E9
| 530435 ||  || — || November 10, 1996 || Kitt Peak || Spacewatch ||  || align=right | 1.4 km || 
|-id=436 bgcolor=#E9E9E9
| 530436 ||  || — || April 3, 2011 || Haleakala || Pan-STARRS ||  || align=right data-sort-value="0.95" | 950 m || 
|-id=437 bgcolor=#d6d6d6
| 530437 ||  || — || April 14, 2010 || WISE || WISE || Tj (2.99) || align=right | 3.4 km || 
|-id=438 bgcolor=#d6d6d6
| 530438 ||  || — || February 16, 2010 || Mount Lemmon || Mount Lemmon Survey ||  || align=right | 2.5 km || 
|-id=439 bgcolor=#d6d6d6
| 530439 ||  || — || March 25, 2010 || WISE || WISE ||  || align=right | 5.3 km || 
|-id=440 bgcolor=#E9E9E9
| 530440 ||  || — || April 27, 2011 || La Sagra || OAM Obs. ||  || align=right | 1.7 km || 
|-id=441 bgcolor=#fefefe
| 530441 ||  || — || April 24, 2011 || Kitt Peak || Spacewatch || H || align=right data-sort-value="0.69" | 690 m || 
|-id=442 bgcolor=#E9E9E9
| 530442 ||  || — || April 20, 2010 || WISE || WISE ||  || align=right | 1.5 km || 
|-id=443 bgcolor=#E9E9E9
| 530443 ||  || — || April 23, 2011 || Kitt Peak || Spacewatch ||  || align=right | 2.4 km || 
|-id=444 bgcolor=#E9E9E9
| 530444 ||  || — || May 15, 2007 || Mount Lemmon || Mount Lemmon Survey ||  || align=right data-sort-value="0.76" | 760 m || 
|-id=445 bgcolor=#E9E9E9
| 530445 ||  || — || April 15, 2007 || Kitt Peak || Spacewatch ||  || align=right data-sort-value="0.78" | 780 m || 
|-id=446 bgcolor=#E9E9E9
| 530446 ||  || — || April 26, 2011 || Kitt Peak || Spacewatch ||  || align=right data-sort-value="0.59" | 590 m || 
|-id=447 bgcolor=#E9E9E9
| 530447 ||  || — || April 11, 2007 || Mount Lemmon || Mount Lemmon Survey ||  || align=right data-sort-value="0.86" | 860 m || 
|-id=448 bgcolor=#E9E9E9
| 530448 ||  || — || April 28, 2011 || Haleakala || Pan-STARRS || EUN || align=right | 1.4 km || 
|-id=449 bgcolor=#d6d6d6
| 530449 ||  || — || February 12, 2011 || Mount Lemmon || Mount Lemmon Survey ||  || align=right | 2.7 km || 
|-id=450 bgcolor=#d6d6d6
| 530450 ||  || — || April 28, 2011 || Haleakala || Pan-STARRS ||  || align=right | 2.9 km || 
|-id=451 bgcolor=#d6d6d6
| 530451 ||  || — || April 26, 2011 || Kitt Peak || Spacewatch ||  || align=right | 3.2 km || 
|-id=452 bgcolor=#d6d6d6
| 530452 ||  || — || April 26, 2011 || Kitt Peak || Spacewatch ||  || align=right | 2.8 km || 
|-id=453 bgcolor=#E9E9E9
| 530453 ||  || — || April 6, 2011 || Mount Lemmon || Mount Lemmon Survey ||  || align=right | 2.6 km || 
|-id=454 bgcolor=#d6d6d6
| 530454 ||  || — || April 27, 2011 || Haleakala || Pan-STARRS || EOS || align=right | 1.9 km || 
|-id=455 bgcolor=#d6d6d6
| 530455 ||  || — || September 13, 2007 || Mount Lemmon || Mount Lemmon Survey ||  || align=right | 2.7 km || 
|-id=456 bgcolor=#E9E9E9
| 530456 ||  || — || December 25, 2005 || Kitt Peak || Spacewatch || JUN || align=right data-sort-value="0.76" | 760 m || 
|-id=457 bgcolor=#E9E9E9
| 530457 ||  || — || April 30, 2011 || Kitt Peak || Spacewatch ||  || align=right data-sort-value="0.82" | 820 m || 
|-id=458 bgcolor=#fefefe
| 530458 ||  || — || September 27, 2009 || Kitt Peak || Spacewatch || H || align=right data-sort-value="0.48" | 480 m || 
|-id=459 bgcolor=#d6d6d6
| 530459 ||  || — || April 22, 2011 || Kitt Peak || Spacewatch ||  || align=right | 2.9 km || 
|-id=460 bgcolor=#d6d6d6
| 530460 ||  || — || April 28, 2011 || Haleakala || Pan-STARRS ||  || align=right | 3.0 km || 
|-id=461 bgcolor=#d6d6d6
| 530461 ||  || — || March 29, 2011 || Kitt Peak || Spacewatch ||  || align=right | 2.8 km || 
|-id=462 bgcolor=#E9E9E9
| 530462 ||  || — || April 28, 2011 || Haleakala || Pan-STARRS ||  || align=right | 1.7 km || 
|-id=463 bgcolor=#E9E9E9
| 530463 ||  || — || April 21, 2011 || Haleakala || Pan-STARRS ||  || align=right | 1.1 km || 
|-id=464 bgcolor=#fefefe
| 530464 ||  || — || March 31, 2011 || Mount Lemmon || Mount Lemmon Survey || H || align=right data-sort-value="0.76" | 760 m || 
|-id=465 bgcolor=#E9E9E9
| 530465 ||  || — || April 22, 2011 || Kitt Peak || Spacewatch ||  || align=right | 2.8 km || 
|-id=466 bgcolor=#E9E9E9
| 530466 ||  || — || April 27, 2011 || Kitt Peak || Spacewatch ||  || align=right | 1.2 km || 
|-id=467 bgcolor=#fefefe
| 530467 ||  || — || April 5, 2011 || Kitt Peak || Spacewatch || H || align=right data-sort-value="0.47" | 470 m || 
|-id=468 bgcolor=#d6d6d6
| 530468 ||  || — || January 30, 2011 || Haleakala || Pan-STARRS ||  || align=right | 4.4 km || 
|-id=469 bgcolor=#E9E9E9
| 530469 ||  || — || April 28, 2011 || Haleakala || Pan-STARRS ||  || align=right data-sort-value="0.82" | 820 m || 
|-id=470 bgcolor=#fefefe
| 530470 ||  || — || May 10, 2008 || Mount Lemmon || Mount Lemmon Survey || H || align=right data-sort-value="0.76" | 760 m || 
|-id=471 bgcolor=#E9E9E9
| 530471 ||  || — || March 26, 2011 || Mount Lemmon || Mount Lemmon Survey ||  || align=right | 1.7 km || 
|-id=472 bgcolor=#E9E9E9
| 530472 ||  || — || April 1, 2011 || Mount Lemmon || Mount Lemmon Survey || EUN || align=right data-sort-value="0.80" | 800 m || 
|-id=473 bgcolor=#E9E9E9
| 530473 ||  || — || April 5, 2011 || Kitt Peak || Spacewatch ||  || align=right | 2.0 km || 
|-id=474 bgcolor=#d6d6d6
| 530474 ||  || — || April 26, 2011 || Kitt Peak || Spacewatch ||  || align=right | 2.6 km || 
|-id=475 bgcolor=#E9E9E9
| 530475 ||  || — || May 11, 2007 || Mount Lemmon || Mount Lemmon Survey ||  || align=right | 1.0 km || 
|-id=476 bgcolor=#E9E9E9
| 530476 ||  || — || October 20, 2008 || Kitt Peak || Spacewatch ||  || align=right data-sort-value="0.77" | 770 m || 
|-id=477 bgcolor=#d6d6d6
| 530477 ||  || — || April 26, 2011 || Mount Lemmon || Mount Lemmon Survey ||  || align=right | 2.7 km || 
|-id=478 bgcolor=#d6d6d6
| 530478 ||  || — || April 11, 2011 || Mount Lemmon || Mount Lemmon Survey ||  || align=right | 2.9 km || 
|-id=479 bgcolor=#d6d6d6
| 530479 ||  || — || April 23, 2011 || Kitt Peak || Spacewatch ||  || align=right | 2.3 km || 
|-id=480 bgcolor=#E9E9E9
| 530480 ||  || — || May 2, 2010 || WISE || WISE ||  || align=right | 1.9 km || 
|-id=481 bgcolor=#E9E9E9
| 530481 ||  || — || January 28, 2010 || WISE || WISE ||  || align=right | 2.2 km || 
|-id=482 bgcolor=#E9E9E9
| 530482 ||  || — || March 15, 2007 || Mount Lemmon || Mount Lemmon Survey ||  || align=right data-sort-value="0.82" | 820 m || 
|-id=483 bgcolor=#E9E9E9
| 530483 ||  || — || May 3, 2011 || Kitt Peak || Spacewatch ||  || align=right data-sort-value="0.89" | 890 m || 
|-id=484 bgcolor=#FA8072
| 530484 ||  || — || November 20, 2003 || Kitt Peak || Spacewatch ||  || align=right data-sort-value="0.53" | 530 m || 
|-id=485 bgcolor=#fefefe
| 530485 ||  || — || October 2, 2009 || Mount Lemmon || Mount Lemmon Survey || H || align=right data-sort-value="0.55" | 550 m || 
|-id=486 bgcolor=#d6d6d6
| 530486 ||  || — || May 1, 2011 || Haleakala || Pan-STARRS || EOS || align=right | 2.2 km || 
|-id=487 bgcolor=#E9E9E9
| 530487 ||  || — || April 5, 2011 || Catalina || CSS ||  || align=right | 1.3 km || 
|-id=488 bgcolor=#E9E9E9
| 530488 ||  || — || April 24, 2011 || Kitt Peak || Spacewatch ||  || align=right | 1.3 km || 
|-id=489 bgcolor=#E9E9E9
| 530489 ||  || — || April 13, 2011 || Haleakala || Pan-STARRS ||  || align=right | 1.4 km || 
|-id=490 bgcolor=#E9E9E9
| 530490 ||  || — || October 28, 2008 || Mount Lemmon || Mount Lemmon Survey ||  || align=right data-sort-value="0.95" | 950 m || 
|-id=491 bgcolor=#E9E9E9
| 530491 ||  || — || April 26, 2011 || Kitt Peak || Spacewatch ||  || align=right data-sort-value="0.84" | 840 m || 
|-id=492 bgcolor=#E9E9E9
| 530492 ||  || — || April 13, 2011 || Kitt Peak || Spacewatch ||  || align=right data-sort-value="0.72" | 720 m || 
|-id=493 bgcolor=#d6d6d6
| 530493 ||  || — || April 23, 2011 || Kitt Peak || Spacewatch || EOS || align=right | 1.7 km || 
|-id=494 bgcolor=#E9E9E9
| 530494 ||  || — || May 6, 2011 || Kitt Peak || Spacewatch ||  || align=right | 1.0 km || 
|-id=495 bgcolor=#E9E9E9
| 530495 ||  || — || May 7, 2011 || Kitt Peak || Spacewatch ||  || align=right | 1.4 km || 
|-id=496 bgcolor=#E9E9E9
| 530496 ||  || — || May 13, 2011 || Mount Lemmon || Mount Lemmon Survey ||  || align=right | 1.5 km || 
|-id=497 bgcolor=#E9E9E9
| 530497 ||  || — || March 27, 2011 || Kitt Peak || Spacewatch ||  || align=right | 1.0 km || 
|-id=498 bgcolor=#E9E9E9
| 530498 ||  || — || April 4, 2011 || Catalina || CSS ||  || align=right | 1.2 km || 
|-id=499 bgcolor=#E9E9E9
| 530499 ||  || — || May 10, 2007 || Mount Lemmon || Mount Lemmon Survey ||  || align=right data-sort-value="0.83" | 830 m || 
|-id=500 bgcolor=#E9E9E9
| 530500 ||  || — || November 27, 2009 || Mount Lemmon || Mount Lemmon Survey ||  || align=right | 1.3 km || 
|}

530501–530600 

|-bgcolor=#d6d6d6
| 530501 ||  || — || May 1, 2011 || Haleakala || Pan-STARRS ||  || align=right | 2.8 km || 
|-id=502 bgcolor=#E9E9E9
| 530502 ||  || — || May 6, 2011 || Kitt Peak || Spacewatch ||  || align=right | 1.1 km || 
|-id=503 bgcolor=#E9E9E9
| 530503 ||  || — || May 12, 2011 || Mount Lemmon || Mount Lemmon Survey ||  || align=right | 2.1 km || 
|-id=504 bgcolor=#d6d6d6
| 530504 ||  || — || May 1, 2011 || Haleakala || Pan-STARRS ||  || align=right | 2.3 km || 
|-id=505 bgcolor=#E9E9E9
| 530505 ||  || — || May 3, 2011 || Mount Lemmon || Mount Lemmon Survey ||  || align=right | 1.3 km || 
|-id=506 bgcolor=#d6d6d6
| 530506 ||  || — || October 14, 2007 || Mount Lemmon || Mount Lemmon Survey || Tj (2.96) || align=right | 3.4 km || 
|-id=507 bgcolor=#E9E9E9
| 530507 ||  || — || April 30, 2011 || Haleakala || Pan-STARRS ||  || align=right | 1.4 km || 
|-id=508 bgcolor=#d6d6d6
| 530508 ||  || — || November 18, 2003 || Kitt Peak || Spacewatch ||  || align=right | 2.8 km || 
|-id=509 bgcolor=#FA8072
| 530509 ||  || — || May 22, 2011 || Mount Lemmon || Mount Lemmon Survey ||  || align=right | 1.1 km || 
|-id=510 bgcolor=#E9E9E9
| 530510 ||  || — || May 7, 2011 || Kitt Peak || Spacewatch ||  || align=right data-sort-value="0.90" | 900 m || 
|-id=511 bgcolor=#E9E9E9
| 530511 ||  || — || April 29, 2011 || Mount Lemmon || Mount Lemmon Survey ||  || align=right | 1.4 km || 
|-id=512 bgcolor=#E9E9E9
| 530512 ||  || — || May 25, 2011 || Kitt Peak || Spacewatch ||  || align=right | 1.6 km || 
|-id=513 bgcolor=#E9E9E9
| 530513 ||  || — || May 21, 2011 || Haleakala || Pan-STARRS ||  || align=right data-sort-value="0.91" | 910 m || 
|-id=514 bgcolor=#E9E9E9
| 530514 ||  || — || April 30, 2011 || Haleakala || Pan-STARRS ||  || align=right | 1.2 km || 
|-id=515 bgcolor=#E9E9E9
| 530515 ||  || — || May 21, 2011 || Haleakala || Pan-STARRS ||  || align=right data-sort-value="0.90" | 900 m || 
|-id=516 bgcolor=#d6d6d6
| 530516 ||  || — || May 23, 2011 || Mount Lemmon || Mount Lemmon Survey ||  || align=right | 2.7 km || 
|-id=517 bgcolor=#E9E9E9
| 530517 ||  || — || May 22, 2011 || Mount Lemmon || Mount Lemmon Survey ||  || align=right data-sort-value="0.89" | 890 m || 
|-id=518 bgcolor=#E9E9E9
| 530518 ||  || — || May 21, 2011 || Mount Lemmon || Mount Lemmon Survey ||  || align=right | 2.1 km || 
|-id=519 bgcolor=#E9E9E9
| 530519 ||  || — || May 22, 2011 || Mount Lemmon || Mount Lemmon Survey ||  || align=right | 1.4 km || 
|-id=520 bgcolor=#FFC2E0
| 530520 ||  || — || June 9, 2011 || Catalina || CSS || APOPHA || align=right data-sort-value="0.16" | 160 m || 
|-id=521 bgcolor=#E9E9E9
| 530521 ||  || — || December 31, 2005 || Kitt Peak || Spacewatch ||  || align=right | 1.5 km || 
|-id=522 bgcolor=#fefefe
| 530522 ||  || — || September 27, 2005 || Kitt Peak || Spacewatch ||  || align=right data-sort-value="0.51" | 510 m || 
|-id=523 bgcolor=#fefefe
| 530523 ||  || — || June 9, 2011 || Mount Lemmon || Mount Lemmon Survey ||  || align=right data-sort-value="0.59" | 590 m || 
|-id=524 bgcolor=#E9E9E9
| 530524 ||  || — || June 3, 2011 || Mount Lemmon || Mount Lemmon Survey ||  || align=right data-sort-value="0.85" | 850 m || 
|-id=525 bgcolor=#d6d6d6
| 530525 ||  || — || June 27, 2011 || Kitt Peak || Spacewatch ||  || align=right | 2.4 km || 
|-id=526 bgcolor=#E9E9E9
| 530526 ||  || — || June 27, 2011 || Mount Lemmon || Mount Lemmon Survey ||  || align=right | 1.8 km || 
|-id=527 bgcolor=#E9E9E9
| 530527 ||  || — || February 16, 2010 || Mount Lemmon || Mount Lemmon Survey ||  || align=right | 1.9 km || 
|-id=528 bgcolor=#d6d6d6
| 530528 ||  || — || July 1, 2011 || Kitt Peak || Spacewatch ||  || align=right | 3.7 km || 
|-id=529 bgcolor=#d6d6d6
| 530529 ||  || — || July 1, 2011 || Kitt Peak || Spacewatch ||  || align=right | 2.4 km || 
|-id=530 bgcolor=#fefefe
| 530530 ||  || — || July 22, 2011 || Haleakala || Pan-STARRS ||  || align=right data-sort-value="0.70" | 700 m || 
|-id=531 bgcolor=#FFC2E0
| 530531 ||  || — || December 15, 2010 || Haleakala || Pan-STARRS || AMOcritical || align=right data-sort-value="0.28" | 280 m || 
|-id=532 bgcolor=#E9E9E9
| 530532 ||  || — || July 26, 2011 || Haleakala || Pan-STARRS ||  || align=right | 2.2 km || 
|-id=533 bgcolor=#d6d6d6
| 530533 ||  || — || July 2, 2011 || Kitt Peak || Spacewatch ||  || align=right | 4.0 km || 
|-id=534 bgcolor=#d6d6d6
| 530534 ||  || — || July 26, 2011 || Haleakala || Pan-STARRS ||  || align=right | 2.1 km || 
|-id=535 bgcolor=#FA8072
| 530535 ||  || — || November 20, 2001 || Socorro || LINEAR ||  || align=right data-sort-value="0.72" | 720 m || 
|-id=536 bgcolor=#d6d6d6
| 530536 ||  || — || January 28, 2010 || WISE || WISE ||  || align=right | 3.5 km || 
|-id=537 bgcolor=#d6d6d6
| 530537 ||  || — || October 22, 2006 || Mount Lemmon || Mount Lemmon Survey ||  || align=right | 3.4 km || 
|-id=538 bgcolor=#E9E9E9
| 530538 ||  || — || October 7, 2007 || Mount Lemmon || Mount Lemmon Survey ||  || align=right | 1.1 km || 
|-id=539 bgcolor=#C2FFFF
| 530539 ||  || — || July 28, 2011 || Haleakala || Pan-STARRS || L5 || align=right | 5.9 km || 
|-id=540 bgcolor=#FA8072
| 530540 ||  || — || July 31, 2011 || Haleakala || Pan-STARRS ||  || align=right data-sort-value="0.68" | 680 m || 
|-id=541 bgcolor=#fefefe
| 530541 ||  || — || December 31, 2008 || Kitt Peak || Spacewatch || PHO || align=right | 1.0 km || 
|-id=542 bgcolor=#d6d6d6
| 530542 ||  || — || January 16, 2009 || Kitt Peak || Spacewatch ||  || align=right | 3.1 km || 
|-id=543 bgcolor=#E9E9E9
| 530543 ||  || — || July 28, 2011 || Haleakala || Pan-STARRS ||  || align=right | 2.0 km || 
|-id=544 bgcolor=#E9E9E9
| 530544 ||  || — || September 9, 2007 || Kitt Peak || Spacewatch ||  || align=right | 1.3 km || 
|-id=545 bgcolor=#E9E9E9
| 530545 ||  || — || September 10, 2007 || Mount Lemmon || Mount Lemmon Survey ||  || align=right | 1.2 km || 
|-id=546 bgcolor=#d6d6d6
| 530546 ||  || — || August 2, 2011 || Haleakala || Pan-STARRS ||  || align=right | 2.5 km || 
|-id=547 bgcolor=#d6d6d6
| 530547 ||  || — || August 2, 2011 || Haleakala || Pan-STARRS ||  || align=right | 2.1 km || 
|-id=548 bgcolor=#fefefe
| 530548 ||  || — || August 9, 2011 || Haleakala || Pan-STARRS ||  || align=right data-sort-value="0.59" | 590 m || 
|-id=549 bgcolor=#fefefe
| 530549 ||  || — || December 21, 2008 || Mount Lemmon || Mount Lemmon Survey ||  || align=right data-sort-value="0.49" | 490 m || 
|-id=550 bgcolor=#d6d6d6
| 530550 ||  || — || August 19, 2011 || Haleakala || Pan-STARRS ||  || align=right | 2.3 km || 
|-id=551 bgcolor=#E9E9E9
| 530551 ||  || — || July 27, 2011 || La Sagra || OAM Obs. ||  || align=right | 2.5 km || 
|-id=552 bgcolor=#d6d6d6
| 530552 ||  || — || August 19, 2011 || Haleakala || Pan-STARRS ||  || align=right | 2.7 km || 
|-id=553 bgcolor=#C2FFFF
| 530553 ||  || — || August 19, 2011 || Haleakala || Pan-STARRS || L5 || align=right | 6.9 km || 
|-id=554 bgcolor=#FA8072
| 530554 ||  || — || August 22, 2011 || Haleakala || Pan-STARRS ||  || align=right | 1.2 km || 
|-id=555 bgcolor=#E9E9E9
| 530555 ||  || — || August 23, 2011 || Socorro || LINEAR ||  || align=right | 1.3 km || 
|-id=556 bgcolor=#fefefe
| 530556 ||  || — || July 27, 2011 || Haleakala || Pan-STARRS ||  || align=right data-sort-value="0.74" | 740 m || 
|-id=557 bgcolor=#d6d6d6
| 530557 ||  || — || August 23, 2011 || Haleakala || Pan-STARRS ||  || align=right | 2.4 km || 
|-id=558 bgcolor=#FA8072
| 530558 ||  || — || August 25, 2011 || La Sagra || OAM Obs. ||  || align=right data-sort-value="0.75" | 750 m || 
|-id=559 bgcolor=#fefefe
| 530559 ||  || — || August 20, 2011 || Haleakala || Pan-STARRS ||  || align=right data-sort-value="0.87" | 870 m || 
|-id=560 bgcolor=#fefefe
| 530560 ||  || — || June 5, 2011 || Mount Lemmon || Mount Lemmon Survey ||  || align=right data-sort-value="0.68" | 680 m || 
|-id=561 bgcolor=#fefefe
| 530561 ||  || — || August 1, 2011 || Siding Spring || SSS ||  || align=right data-sort-value="0.62" | 620 m || 
|-id=562 bgcolor=#fefefe
| 530562 ||  || — || December 25, 2005 || Kitt Peak || Spacewatch ||  || align=right data-sort-value="0.56" | 560 m || 
|-id=563 bgcolor=#E9E9E9
| 530563 ||  || — || October 9, 2007 || Mount Lemmon || Mount Lemmon Survey ||  || align=right | 1.2 km || 
|-id=564 bgcolor=#fefefe
| 530564 ||  || — || November 6, 2008 || Mount Lemmon || Mount Lemmon Survey ||  || align=right data-sort-value="0.49" | 490 m || 
|-id=565 bgcolor=#d6d6d6
| 530565 ||  || — || August 30, 2011 || Haleakala || Pan-STARRS || NAE || align=right | 2.1 km || 
|-id=566 bgcolor=#fefefe
| 530566 ||  || — || August 31, 2011 || Haleakala || Pan-STARRS ||  || align=right data-sort-value="0.54" | 540 m || 
|-id=567 bgcolor=#fefefe
| 530567 ||  || — || October 13, 2001 || Kitt Peak || Spacewatch ||  || align=right data-sort-value="0.46" | 460 m || 
|-id=568 bgcolor=#fefefe
| 530568 ||  || — || March 13, 1999 || Kitt Peak || Spacewatch ||  || align=right data-sort-value="0.99" | 990 m || 
|-id=569 bgcolor=#fefefe
| 530569 ||  || — || August 24, 2011 || Haleakala || Pan-STARRS ||  || align=right data-sort-value="0.47" | 470 m || 
|-id=570 bgcolor=#E9E9E9
| 530570 ||  || — || August 24, 2011 || Haleakala || Pan-STARRS ||  || align=right | 1.3 km || 
|-id=571 bgcolor=#d6d6d6
| 530571 ||  || — || June 26, 2011 || Mount Lemmon || Mount Lemmon Survey ||  || align=right | 2.6 km || 
|-id=572 bgcolor=#E9E9E9
| 530572 ||  || — || October 3, 2002 || Campo Imperatore || CINEOS ||  || align=right | 1.8 km || 
|-id=573 bgcolor=#FA8072
| 530573 ||  || — || August 23, 2011 || La Sagra || OAM Obs. ||  || align=right data-sort-value="0.66" | 660 m || 
|-id=574 bgcolor=#fefefe
| 530574 ||  || — || September 24, 2008 || Mount Lemmon || Mount Lemmon Survey ||  || align=right data-sort-value="0.54" | 540 m || 
|-id=575 bgcolor=#d6d6d6
| 530575 ||  || — || March 3, 2009 || Mount Lemmon || Mount Lemmon Survey ||  || align=right | 2.8 km || 
|-id=576 bgcolor=#d6d6d6
| 530576 ||  || — || November 14, 2007 || Kitt Peak || Spacewatch ||  || align=right | 2.2 km || 
|-id=577 bgcolor=#d6d6d6
| 530577 ||  || — || August 27, 2011 || Haleakala || Pan-STARRS ||  || align=right | 2.2 km || 
|-id=578 bgcolor=#fefefe
| 530578 ||  || — || August 27, 2011 || Haleakala || Pan-STARRS ||  || align=right data-sort-value="0.62" | 620 m || 
|-id=579 bgcolor=#d6d6d6
| 530579 ||  || — || August 30, 2011 || Haleakala || Pan-STARRS ||  || align=right | 3.0 km || 
|-id=580 bgcolor=#d6d6d6
| 530580 ||  || — || September 7, 2011 || Kitt Peak || Spacewatch ||  || align=right | 2.7 km || 
|-id=581 bgcolor=#d6d6d6
| 530581 ||  || — || September 6, 2011 || Haleakala || Pan-STARRS ||  || align=right | 2.1 km || 
|-id=582 bgcolor=#fefefe
| 530582 ||  || — || December 21, 2008 || Kitt Peak || Spacewatch ||  || align=right data-sort-value="0.59" | 590 m || 
|-id=583 bgcolor=#d6d6d6
| 530583 ||  || — || October 21, 2006 || Mount Lemmon || Mount Lemmon Survey ||  || align=right | 2.3 km || 
|-id=584 bgcolor=#d6d6d6
| 530584 ||  || — || September 2, 2011 || Haleakala || Pan-STARRS ||  || align=right | 2.8 km || 
|-id=585 bgcolor=#d6d6d6
| 530585 ||  || — || September 2, 2011 || Haleakala || Pan-STARRS ||  || align=right | 2.3 km || 
|-id=586 bgcolor=#E9E9E9
| 530586 ||  || — || September 4, 2011 || Haleakala || Pan-STARRS ||  || align=right | 1.6 km || 
|-id=587 bgcolor=#d6d6d6
| 530587 ||  || — || September 4, 2011 || Haleakala || Pan-STARRS ||  || align=right | 2.1 km || 
|-id=588 bgcolor=#d6d6d6
| 530588 ||  || — || September 17, 2011 || Haleakala || Pan-STARRS ||  || align=right | 2.2 km || 
|-id=589 bgcolor=#E9E9E9
| 530589 ||  || — || August 31, 2011 || Haleakala || Pan-STARRS ||  || align=right | 1.5 km || 
|-id=590 bgcolor=#fefefe
| 530590 ||  || — || September 2, 2011 || Haleakala || Pan-STARRS ||  || align=right data-sort-value="0.68" | 680 m || 
|-id=591 bgcolor=#d6d6d6
| 530591 ||  || — || September 19, 2011 || Mount Lemmon || Mount Lemmon Survey ||  || align=right | 2.8 km || 
|-id=592 bgcolor=#fefefe
| 530592 ||  || — || September 21, 2011 || Catalina || CSS ||  || align=right data-sort-value="0.68" | 680 m || 
|-id=593 bgcolor=#E9E9E9
| 530593 ||  || — || September 21, 2011 || La Sagra || OAM Obs. ||  || align=right | 1.8 km || 
|-id=594 bgcolor=#fefefe
| 530594 ||  || — || September 21, 2011 || Catalina || CSS ||  || align=right data-sort-value="0.92" | 920 m || 
|-id=595 bgcolor=#fefefe
| 530595 ||  || — || March 26, 2006 || Anderson Mesa || LONEOS ||  || align=right data-sort-value="0.99" | 990 m || 
|-id=596 bgcolor=#fefefe
| 530596 ||  || — || September 20, 2011 || Kitt Peak || Spacewatch ||  || align=right data-sort-value="0.51" | 510 m || 
|-id=597 bgcolor=#d6d6d6
| 530597 ||  || — || September 18, 2011 || Mount Lemmon || Mount Lemmon Survey ||  || align=right | 1.7 km || 
|-id=598 bgcolor=#d6d6d6
| 530598 ||  || — || September 28, 2006 || Catalina || CSS ||  || align=right | 3.4 km || 
|-id=599 bgcolor=#E9E9E9
| 530599 ||  || — || August 24, 2011 || La Sagra || OAM Obs. ||  || align=right | 2.2 km || 
|-id=600 bgcolor=#E9E9E9
| 530600 ||  || — || August 27, 2011 || Haleakala || Pan-STARRS ||  || align=right | 1.3 km || 
|}

530601–530700 

|-bgcolor=#fefefe
| 530601 ||  || — || September 23, 2011 || Haleakala || Pan-STARRS ||  || align=right data-sort-value="0.57" | 570 m || 
|-id=602 bgcolor=#fefefe
| 530602 ||  || — || November 20, 2004 || Kitt Peak || Spacewatch ||  || align=right data-sort-value="0.74" | 740 m || 
|-id=603 bgcolor=#fefefe
| 530603 ||  || — || September 23, 2011 || Haleakala || Pan-STARRS ||  || align=right data-sort-value="0.78" | 780 m || 
|-id=604 bgcolor=#fefefe
| 530604 ||  || — || September 2, 2011 || Haleakala || Pan-STARRS ||  || align=right data-sort-value="0.50" | 500 m || 
|-id=605 bgcolor=#fefefe
| 530605 ||  || — || November 22, 2008 || Kitt Peak || Spacewatch || (2076) || align=right data-sort-value="0.53" | 530 m || 
|-id=606 bgcolor=#fefefe
| 530606 ||  || — || December 31, 2008 || Kitt Peak || Spacewatch ||  || align=right data-sort-value="0.49" | 490 m || 
|-id=607 bgcolor=#d6d6d6
| 530607 ||  || — || September 19, 2011 || Haleakala || Pan-STARRS ||  || align=right | 3.2 km || 
|-id=608 bgcolor=#E9E9E9
| 530608 ||  || — || October 14, 2007 || Mount Lemmon || Mount Lemmon Survey ||  || align=right | 1.7 km || 
|-id=609 bgcolor=#E9E9E9
| 530609 ||  || — || July 14, 2010 || WISE || WISE ||  || align=right | 3.1 km || 
|-id=610 bgcolor=#fefefe
| 530610 ||  || — || August 25, 2004 || Kitt Peak || Spacewatch ||  || align=right data-sort-value="0.47" | 470 m || 
|-id=611 bgcolor=#fefefe
| 530611 ||  || — || August 26, 2000 || Socorro || LINEAR || ERI || align=right | 1.4 km || 
|-id=612 bgcolor=#fefefe
| 530612 ||  || — || September 21, 2011 || Kitt Peak || Spacewatch ||  || align=right data-sort-value="0.74" | 740 m || 
|-id=613 bgcolor=#fefefe
| 530613 ||  || — || October 14, 2004 || Kitt Peak || Spacewatch ||  || align=right data-sort-value="0.48" | 480 m || 
|-id=614 bgcolor=#fefefe
| 530614 ||  || — || September 8, 2004 || Socorro || LINEAR ||  || align=right data-sort-value="0.65" | 650 m || 
|-id=615 bgcolor=#E9E9E9
| 530615 ||  || — || July 13, 2010 || WISE || WISE ||  || align=right | 1.8 km || 
|-id=616 bgcolor=#fefefe
| 530616 ||  || — || September 22, 2011 || Kitt Peak || Spacewatch ||  || align=right data-sort-value="0.67" | 670 m || 
|-id=617 bgcolor=#fefefe
| 530617 ||  || — || November 10, 2004 || Kitt Peak || Spacewatch ||  || align=right data-sort-value="0.59" | 590 m || 
|-id=618 bgcolor=#fefefe
| 530618 ||  || — || September 9, 2004 || Kitt Peak || Spacewatch ||  || align=right data-sort-value="0.75" | 750 m || 
|-id=619 bgcolor=#fefefe
| 530619 ||  || — || October 9, 2004 || Kitt Peak || Spacewatch ||  || align=right data-sort-value="0.58" | 580 m || 
|-id=620 bgcolor=#fefefe
| 530620 ||  || — || February 1, 2006 || Kitt Peak || Spacewatch ||  || align=right data-sort-value="0.90" | 900 m || 
|-id=621 bgcolor=#d6d6d6
| 530621 ||  || — || September 8, 2011 || Kitt Peak || Spacewatch ||  || align=right | 2.8 km || 
|-id=622 bgcolor=#fefefe
| 530622 ||  || — || September 15, 2004 || Kitt Peak || Spacewatch ||  || align=right data-sort-value="0.65" | 650 m || 
|-id=623 bgcolor=#fefefe
| 530623 ||  || — || October 23, 2004 || Kitt Peak || Spacewatch ||  || align=right data-sort-value="0.73" | 730 m || 
|-id=624 bgcolor=#fefefe
| 530624 ||  || — || June 11, 2011 || Haleakala || Pan-STARRS ||  || align=right data-sort-value="0.88" | 880 m || 
|-id=625 bgcolor=#fefefe
| 530625 ||  || — || September 13, 2004 || Kitt Peak || Spacewatch ||  || align=right data-sort-value="0.55" | 550 m || 
|-id=626 bgcolor=#fefefe
| 530626 ||  || — || September 24, 1960 || Palomar || PLS ||  || align=right data-sort-value="0.62" | 620 m || 
|-id=627 bgcolor=#fefefe
| 530627 ||  || — || February 2, 2006 || Mount Lemmon || Mount Lemmon Survey ||  || align=right data-sort-value="0.78" | 780 m || 
|-id=628 bgcolor=#fefefe
| 530628 ||  || — || September 21, 2011 || Kitt Peak || Spacewatch ||  || align=right data-sort-value="0.76" | 760 m || 
|-id=629 bgcolor=#fefefe
| 530629 ||  || — || March 14, 2010 || Mount Lemmon || Mount Lemmon Survey ||  || align=right data-sort-value="0.99" | 990 m || 
|-id=630 bgcolor=#fefefe
| 530630 ||  || — || December 29, 2008 || Mount Lemmon || Mount Lemmon Survey ||  || align=right data-sort-value="0.66" | 660 m || 
|-id=631 bgcolor=#fefefe
| 530631 ||  || — || September 20, 2011 || Kitt Peak || Spacewatch ||  || align=right data-sort-value="0.62" | 620 m || 
|-id=632 bgcolor=#d6d6d6
| 530632 ||  || — || September 26, 2011 || Mount Lemmon || Mount Lemmon Survey ||  || align=right | 2.0 km || 
|-id=633 bgcolor=#fefefe
| 530633 ||  || — || December 30, 2008 || Kitt Peak || Spacewatch ||  || align=right data-sort-value="0.50" | 500 m || 
|-id=634 bgcolor=#d6d6d6
| 530634 ||  || — || February 12, 2004 || Kitt Peak || Spacewatch ||  || align=right | 2.4 km || 
|-id=635 bgcolor=#fefefe
| 530635 ||  || — || April 5, 2010 || Kitt Peak || Spacewatch ||  || align=right data-sort-value="0.91" | 910 m || 
|-id=636 bgcolor=#fefefe
| 530636 ||  || — || September 20, 2011 || Catalina || CSS ||  || align=right data-sort-value="0.90" | 900 m || 
|-id=637 bgcolor=#fefefe
| 530637 ||  || — || December 21, 2008 || Kitt Peak || Spacewatch || V || align=right data-sort-value="0.53" | 530 m || 
|-id=638 bgcolor=#fefefe
| 530638 ||  || — || September 23, 2011 || Mount Lemmon || Mount Lemmon Survey ||  || align=right data-sort-value="0.84" | 840 m || 
|-id=639 bgcolor=#d6d6d6
| 530639 ||  || — || September 24, 2011 || La Sagra || OAM Obs. ||  || align=right | 2.3 km || 
|-id=640 bgcolor=#d6d6d6
| 530640 ||  || — || September 28, 2011 || Mount Lemmon || Mount Lemmon Survey || KOR || align=right | 1.1 km || 
|-id=641 bgcolor=#fefefe
| 530641 ||  || — || October 15, 2004 || Mount Lemmon || Mount Lemmon Survey ||  || align=right data-sort-value="0.66" | 660 m || 
|-id=642 bgcolor=#fefefe
| 530642 ||  || — || September 5, 2011 || La Sagra || OAM Obs. ||  || align=right data-sort-value="0.76" | 760 m || 
|-id=643 bgcolor=#fefefe
| 530643 ||  || — || October 8, 2004 || Anderson Mesa || LONEOS ||  || align=right data-sort-value="0.77" | 770 m || 
|-id=644 bgcolor=#fefefe
| 530644 ||  || — || September 26, 2011 || Kitt Peak || Spacewatch ||  || align=right data-sort-value="0.65" | 650 m || 
|-id=645 bgcolor=#fefefe
| 530645 ||  || — || September 26, 2011 || Kitt Peak || Spacewatch ||  || align=right data-sort-value="0.54" | 540 m || 
|-id=646 bgcolor=#fefefe
| 530646 ||  || — || September 26, 2011 || Kitt Peak || Spacewatch ||  || align=right data-sort-value="0.68" | 680 m || 
|-id=647 bgcolor=#fefefe
| 530647 ||  || — || September 26, 2011 || Kitt Peak || Spacewatch ||  || align=right data-sort-value="0.53" | 530 m || 
|-id=648 bgcolor=#d6d6d6
| 530648 ||  || — || September 2, 2011 || Haleakala || Pan-STARRS ||  || align=right | 1.9 km || 
|-id=649 bgcolor=#fefefe
| 530649 ||  || — || December 30, 2008 || Kitt Peak || Spacewatch ||  || align=right data-sort-value="0.57" | 570 m || 
|-id=650 bgcolor=#fefefe
| 530650 ||  || — || September 20, 2011 || Mount Lemmon || Mount Lemmon Survey ||  || align=right data-sort-value="0.57" | 570 m || 
|-id=651 bgcolor=#d6d6d6
| 530651 ||  || — || February 27, 2008 || Mount Lemmon || Mount Lemmon Survey ||  || align=right | 2.5 km || 
|-id=652 bgcolor=#fefefe
| 530652 ||  || — || January 26, 2006 || Mount Lemmon || Mount Lemmon Survey ||  || align=right data-sort-value="0.72" | 720 m || 
|-id=653 bgcolor=#d6d6d6
| 530653 ||  || — || September 29, 2011 || Mount Lemmon || Mount Lemmon Survey ||  || align=right | 2.8 km || 
|-id=654 bgcolor=#E9E9E9
| 530654 ||  || — || October 30, 2007 || Kitt Peak || Spacewatch ||  || align=right | 2.1 km || 
|-id=655 bgcolor=#fefefe
| 530655 ||  || — || October 7, 2004 || Kitt Peak || Spacewatch ||  || align=right data-sort-value="0.75" | 750 m || 
|-id=656 bgcolor=#fefefe
| 530656 ||  || — || August 25, 2011 || La Sagra || OAM Obs. ||  || align=right data-sort-value="0.92" | 920 m || 
|-id=657 bgcolor=#d6d6d6
| 530657 ||  || — || June 11, 2011 || Haleakala || Pan-STARRS || TEL || align=right | 1.6 km || 
|-id=658 bgcolor=#d6d6d6
| 530658 ||  || — || September 21, 2011 || Mount Lemmon || Mount Lemmon Survey ||  || align=right | 3.1 km || 
|-id=659 bgcolor=#fefefe
| 530659 ||  || — || September 11, 2007 || Mount Lemmon || Mount Lemmon Survey || NYS || align=right data-sort-value="0.52" | 520 m || 
|-id=660 bgcolor=#d6d6d6
| 530660 ||  || — || September 28, 2011 || Kitt Peak || Spacewatch ||  || align=right | 3.1 km || 
|-id=661 bgcolor=#fefefe
| 530661 ||  || — || September 20, 2011 || Kitt Peak || Spacewatch ||  || align=right data-sort-value="0.57" | 570 m || 
|-id=662 bgcolor=#fefefe
| 530662 ||  || — || September 26, 2011 || Mount Lemmon || Mount Lemmon Survey ||  || align=right data-sort-value="0.44" | 440 m || 
|-id=663 bgcolor=#d6d6d6
| 530663 ||  || — || September 20, 2011 || Kitt Peak || Spacewatch ||  || align=right | 3.1 km || 
|-id=664 bgcolor=#C2E0FF
| 530664 ||  || — || September 26, 2011 || Haleakala || Pan-STARRS || NTcritical || align=right | 125 km || 
|-id=665 bgcolor=#d6d6d6
| 530665 ||  || — || September 16, 2006 || Catalina || CSS ||  || align=right | 3.6 km || 
|-id=666 bgcolor=#fefefe
| 530666 ||  || — || September 28, 2011 || Mount Lemmon || Mount Lemmon Survey ||  || align=right data-sort-value="0.73" | 730 m || 
|-id=667 bgcolor=#d6d6d6
| 530667 ||  || — || September 30, 2006 || Kitt Peak || Spacewatch ||  || align=right | 1.7 km || 
|-id=668 bgcolor=#d6d6d6
| 530668 ||  || — || September 23, 2011 || Haleakala || Pan-STARRS ||  || align=right | 2.1 km || 
|-id=669 bgcolor=#d6d6d6
| 530669 ||  || — || September 24, 2011 || Mount Lemmon || Mount Lemmon Survey ||  || align=right | 1.9 km || 
|-id=670 bgcolor=#E9E9E9
| 530670 ||  || — || September 25, 2011 || Haleakala || Pan-STARRS ||  || align=right | 1.8 km || 
|-id=671 bgcolor=#fefefe
| 530671 ||  || — || September 21, 2011 || Catalina || CSS ||  || align=right data-sort-value="0.69" | 690 m || 
|-id=672 bgcolor=#d6d6d6
| 530672 ||  || — || October 19, 2006 || Catalina || CSS ||  || align=right | 2.6 km || 
|-id=673 bgcolor=#d6d6d6
| 530673 ||  || — || September 23, 2011 || Haleakala || Pan-STARRS ||  || align=right | 2.7 km || 
|-id=674 bgcolor=#d6d6d6
| 530674 ||  || — || September 24, 2011 || Haleakala || Pan-STARRS ||  || align=right | 2.4 km || 
|-id=675 bgcolor=#d6d6d6
| 530675 ||  || — || September 26, 2011 || Kitt Peak || Spacewatch ||  || align=right | 2.4 km || 
|-id=676 bgcolor=#d6d6d6
| 530676 ||  || — || November 20, 2006 || Mount Lemmon || Mount Lemmon Survey ||  || align=right | 3.1 km || 
|-id=677 bgcolor=#E9E9E9
| 530677 ||  || — || September 18, 2011 || Mount Lemmon || Mount Lemmon Survey ||  || align=right | 1.9 km || 
|-id=678 bgcolor=#fefefe
| 530678 ||  || — || September 23, 2011 || Haleakala || Pan-STARRS ||  || align=right data-sort-value="0.65" | 650 m || 
|-id=679 bgcolor=#fefefe
| 530679 ||  || — || September 19, 2011 || Haleakala || Pan-STARRS ||  || align=right data-sort-value="0.78" | 780 m || 
|-id=680 bgcolor=#fefefe
| 530680 ||  || — || December 5, 2008 || Mount Lemmon || Mount Lemmon Survey ||  || align=right data-sort-value="0.65" | 650 m || 
|-id=681 bgcolor=#fefefe
| 530681 ||  || — || September 14, 2004 || Socorro || LINEAR ||  || align=right data-sort-value="0.74" | 740 m || 
|-id=682 bgcolor=#FA8072
| 530682 ||  || — || September 28, 2011 || Mount Lemmon || Mount Lemmon Survey ||  || align=right data-sort-value="0.67" | 670 m || 
|-id=683 bgcolor=#fefefe
| 530683 ||  || — || October 18, 2011 || Mount Lemmon || Mount Lemmon Survey ||  || align=right data-sort-value="0.57" | 570 m || 
|-id=684 bgcolor=#fefefe
| 530684 ||  || — || December 18, 2001 || Socorro || LINEAR ||  || align=right data-sort-value="0.62" | 620 m || 
|-id=685 bgcolor=#d6d6d6
| 530685 ||  || — || March 19, 2009 || Mount Lemmon || Mount Lemmon Survey ||  || align=right | 1.9 km || 
|-id=686 bgcolor=#fefefe
| 530686 ||  || — || October 18, 2011 || Kitt Peak || Spacewatch ||  || align=right data-sort-value="0.60" | 600 m || 
|-id=687 bgcolor=#E9E9E9
| 530687 ||  || — || April 4, 2010 || Kitt Peak || Spacewatch ||  || align=right | 1.8 km || 
|-id=688 bgcolor=#d6d6d6
| 530688 ||  || — || March 27, 2003 || Kitt Peak || Spacewatch ||  || align=right | 2.5 km || 
|-id=689 bgcolor=#fefefe
| 530689 ||  || — || September 23, 2011 || Haleakala || Pan-STARRS || (1338) || align=right data-sort-value="0.72" | 720 m || 
|-id=690 bgcolor=#fefefe
| 530690 ||  || — || October 9, 2004 || Kitt Peak || Spacewatch ||  || align=right data-sort-value="0.59" | 590 m || 
|-id=691 bgcolor=#fefefe
| 530691 ||  || — || October 17, 2011 || Kitt Peak || Spacewatch ||  || align=right data-sort-value="0.94" | 940 m || 
|-id=692 bgcolor=#fefefe
| 530692 ||  || — || October 17, 2011 || Kitt Peak || Spacewatch ||  || align=right data-sort-value="0.61" | 610 m || 
|-id=693 bgcolor=#fefefe
| 530693 ||  || — || October 5, 2004 || Anderson Mesa || LONEOS ||  || align=right data-sort-value="0.68" | 680 m || 
|-id=694 bgcolor=#fefefe
| 530694 ||  || — || October 17, 2011 || Kitt Peak || Spacewatch ||  || align=right data-sort-value="0.67" | 670 m || 
|-id=695 bgcolor=#d6d6d6
| 530695 ||  || — || October 17, 2011 || Kitt Peak || Spacewatch ||  || align=right | 3.0 km || 
|-id=696 bgcolor=#fefefe
| 530696 ||  || — || October 20, 2011 || Mount Lemmon || Mount Lemmon Survey ||  || align=right data-sort-value="0.66" | 660 m || 
|-id=697 bgcolor=#fefefe
| 530697 ||  || — || September 30, 2011 || Kitt Peak || Spacewatch ||  || align=right data-sort-value="0.56" | 560 m || 
|-id=698 bgcolor=#fefefe
| 530698 ||  || — || September 28, 2011 || Kitt Peak || Spacewatch ||  || align=right data-sort-value="0.69" | 690 m || 
|-id=699 bgcolor=#fefefe
| 530699 ||  || — || September 22, 2011 || Mount Lemmon || Mount Lemmon Survey || MAS || align=right data-sort-value="0.68" | 680 m || 
|-id=700 bgcolor=#d6d6d6
| 530700 ||  || — || November 19, 2006 || Kitt Peak || Spacewatch ||  || align=right | 2.3 km || 
|}

530701–530800 

|-bgcolor=#fefefe
| 530701 ||  || — || October 18, 2011 || Kitt Peak || Spacewatch ||  || align=right data-sort-value="0.58" | 580 m || 
|-id=702 bgcolor=#fefefe
| 530702 ||  || — || October 18, 2011 || Kitt Peak || Spacewatch ||  || align=right data-sort-value="0.68" | 680 m || 
|-id=703 bgcolor=#d6d6d6
| 530703 ||  || — || October 18, 2011 || Kitt Peak || Spacewatch ||  || align=right | 3.7 km || 
|-id=704 bgcolor=#fefefe
| 530704 ||  || — || October 18, 2011 || Mount Lemmon || Mount Lemmon Survey ||  || align=right data-sort-value="0.58" | 580 m || 
|-id=705 bgcolor=#fefefe
| 530705 ||  || — || September 21, 2011 || Kitt Peak || Spacewatch || NYS || align=right data-sort-value="0.56" | 560 m || 
|-id=706 bgcolor=#FA8072
| 530706 ||  || — || October 20, 2011 || Haleakala || Pan-STARRS ||  || align=right data-sort-value="0.85" | 850 m || 
|-id=707 bgcolor=#fefefe
| 530707 ||  || — || November 4, 2004 || Catalina || CSS || PHO || align=right data-sort-value="0.68" | 680 m || 
|-id=708 bgcolor=#d6d6d6
| 530708 ||  || — || October 18, 2011 || Mount Lemmon || Mount Lemmon Survey ||  || align=right | 2.2 km || 
|-id=709 bgcolor=#fefefe
| 530709 ||  || — || November 20, 2004 || Kitt Peak || Spacewatch ||  || align=right data-sort-value="0.68" | 680 m || 
|-id=710 bgcolor=#d6d6d6
| 530710 ||  || — || October 19, 2011 || Kitt Peak || Spacewatch ||  || align=right | 3.0 km || 
|-id=711 bgcolor=#fefefe
| 530711 ||  || — || October 19, 2011 || Kitt Peak || Spacewatch ||  || align=right data-sort-value="0.72" | 720 m || 
|-id=712 bgcolor=#fefefe
| 530712 ||  || — || June 24, 2000 || Kitt Peak || Spacewatch ||  || align=right data-sort-value="0.65" | 650 m || 
|-id=713 bgcolor=#d6d6d6
| 530713 ||  || — || May 22, 2010 || WISE || WISE || EUP || align=right | 3.0 km || 
|-id=714 bgcolor=#E9E9E9
| 530714 ||  || — || October 19, 2011 || Kitt Peak || Spacewatch ||  || align=right | 1.8 km || 
|-id=715 bgcolor=#fefefe
| 530715 ||  || — || September 23, 2011 || Mount Lemmon || Mount Lemmon Survey || NYS || align=right data-sort-value="0.50" | 500 m || 
|-id=716 bgcolor=#fefefe
| 530716 ||  || — || September 3, 2007 || Catalina || CSS ||  || align=right data-sort-value="0.75" | 750 m || 
|-id=717 bgcolor=#fefefe
| 530717 ||  || — || September 29, 2000 || Kitt Peak || Spacewatch || ERI || align=right | 1.1 km || 
|-id=718 bgcolor=#fefefe
| 530718 ||  || — || September 27, 2011 || Mount Lemmon || Mount Lemmon Survey ||  || align=right data-sort-value="0.63" | 630 m || 
|-id=719 bgcolor=#fefefe
| 530719 ||  || — || October 19, 2011 || Kitt Peak || Spacewatch ||  || align=right data-sort-value="0.50" | 500 m || 
|-id=720 bgcolor=#E9E9E9
| 530720 ||  || — || October 20, 2011 || Mount Lemmon || Mount Lemmon Survey ||  || align=right | 2.1 km || 
|-id=721 bgcolor=#fefefe
| 530721 Isscas ||  ||  || September 11, 2007 || XuYi || PMO NEO ||  || align=right data-sort-value="0.70" | 700 m || 
|-id=722 bgcolor=#fefefe
| 530722 ||  || — || September 4, 2007 || Mount Lemmon || Mount Lemmon Survey || NYS || align=right data-sort-value="0.58" | 580 m || 
|-id=723 bgcolor=#FA8072
| 530723 ||  || — || October 21, 2011 || Mount Lemmon || Mount Lemmon Survey ||  || align=right data-sort-value="0.68" | 680 m || 
|-id=724 bgcolor=#fefefe
| 530724 ||  || — || October 21, 2011 || Mount Lemmon || Mount Lemmon Survey ||  || align=right data-sort-value="0.59" | 590 m || 
|-id=725 bgcolor=#fefefe
| 530725 ||  || — || September 30, 2011 || Kitt Peak || Spacewatch ||  || align=right data-sort-value="0.60" | 600 m || 
|-id=726 bgcolor=#fefefe
| 530726 ||  || — || December 7, 2001 || Socorro || LINEAR ||  || align=right | 1.1 km || 
|-id=727 bgcolor=#fefefe
| 530727 ||  || — || October 3, 2011 || Mount Lemmon || Mount Lemmon Survey ||  || align=right data-sort-value="0.71" | 710 m || 
|-id=728 bgcolor=#fefefe
| 530728 ||  || — || September 23, 2011 || Kitt Peak || Spacewatch ||  || align=right data-sort-value="0.70" | 700 m || 
|-id=729 bgcolor=#d6d6d6
| 530729 ||  || — || February 13, 2008 || Mount Lemmon || Mount Lemmon Survey ||  || align=right | 2.2 km || 
|-id=730 bgcolor=#fefefe
| 530730 ||  || — || October 19, 2011 || Mount Lemmon || Mount Lemmon Survey ||  || align=right data-sort-value="0.85" | 850 m || 
|-id=731 bgcolor=#fefefe
| 530731 ||  || — || October 20, 2011 || Mount Lemmon || Mount Lemmon Survey ||  || align=right data-sort-value="0.67" | 670 m || 
|-id=732 bgcolor=#fefefe
| 530732 ||  || — || October 1, 2011 || Mount Lemmon || Mount Lemmon Survey || V || align=right data-sort-value="0.49" | 490 m || 
|-id=733 bgcolor=#fefefe
| 530733 ||  || — || September 21, 2011 || Kitt Peak || Spacewatch ||  || align=right data-sort-value="0.76" | 760 m || 
|-id=734 bgcolor=#fefefe
| 530734 ||  || — || September 21, 2011 || Kitt Peak || Spacewatch ||  || align=right data-sort-value="0.66" | 660 m || 
|-id=735 bgcolor=#fefefe
| 530735 ||  || — || January 1, 2009 || Kitt Peak || Spacewatch ||  || align=right data-sort-value="0.56" | 560 m || 
|-id=736 bgcolor=#fefefe
| 530736 ||  || — || October 4, 2004 || Kitt Peak || Spacewatch ||  || align=right data-sort-value="0.48" | 480 m || 
|-id=737 bgcolor=#fefefe
| 530737 ||  || — || September 22, 2011 || Kitt Peak || Spacewatch ||  || align=right data-sort-value="0.58" | 580 m || 
|-id=738 bgcolor=#fefefe
| 530738 ||  || — || September 23, 2011 || Haleakala || Pan-STARRS ||  || align=right data-sort-value="0.66" | 660 m || 
|-id=739 bgcolor=#d6d6d6
| 530739 Nanligong ||  ||  || October 3, 2011 || XuYi || PMO NEO ||  || align=right | 3.1 km || 
|-id=740 bgcolor=#fefefe
| 530740 ||  || — || November 4, 2004 || Kitt Peak || Spacewatch ||  || align=right data-sort-value="0.54" | 540 m || 
|-id=741 bgcolor=#fefefe
| 530741 ||  || — || October 21, 2011 || Mount Lemmon || Mount Lemmon Survey ||  || align=right data-sort-value="0.75" | 750 m || 
|-id=742 bgcolor=#fefefe
| 530742 ||  || — || January 30, 2006 || Kitt Peak || Spacewatch ||  || align=right data-sort-value="0.52" | 520 m || 
|-id=743 bgcolor=#FFC2E0
| 530743 ||  || — || October 23, 2011 || Haleakala || Pan-STARRS || AMO +1kmcritical || align=right data-sort-value="0.95" | 950 m || 
|-id=744 bgcolor=#fefefe
| 530744 ||  || — || September 21, 2000 || Kitt Peak || Spacewatch ||  || align=right data-sort-value="0.69" | 690 m || 
|-id=745 bgcolor=#fefefe
| 530745 ||  || — || September 23, 2011 || Kitt Peak || Spacewatch ||  || align=right data-sort-value="0.58" | 580 m || 
|-id=746 bgcolor=#d6d6d6
| 530746 ||  || — || October 7, 2005 || Kitt Peak || Spacewatch ||  || align=right | 3.2 km || 
|-id=747 bgcolor=#FA8072
| 530747 ||  || — || January 29, 2009 || Kitt Peak || Spacewatch ||  || align=right data-sort-value="0.65" | 650 m || 
|-id=748 bgcolor=#fefefe
| 530748 ||  || — || October 23, 2011 || Kitt Peak || Spacewatch || V || align=right data-sort-value="0.61" | 610 m || 
|-id=749 bgcolor=#fefefe
| 530749 ||  || — || September 24, 2011 || Mount Lemmon || Mount Lemmon Survey ||  || align=right data-sort-value="0.52" | 520 m || 
|-id=750 bgcolor=#fefefe
| 530750 ||  || — || September 24, 2011 || Mount Lemmon || Mount Lemmon Survey ||  || align=right data-sort-value="0.45" | 450 m || 
|-id=751 bgcolor=#fefefe
| 530751 ||  || — || October 8, 2004 || Socorro || LINEAR ||  || align=right data-sort-value="0.60" | 600 m || 
|-id=752 bgcolor=#fefefe
| 530752 ||  || — || October 20, 2011 || Mount Lemmon || Mount Lemmon Survey ||  || align=right data-sort-value="0.59" | 590 m || 
|-id=753 bgcolor=#fefefe
| 530753 ||  || — || October 21, 2011 || Mount Lemmon || Mount Lemmon Survey ||  || align=right data-sort-value="0.65" | 650 m || 
|-id=754 bgcolor=#fefefe
| 530754 ||  || — || October 23, 2011 || Kitt Peak || Spacewatch ||  || align=right data-sort-value="0.57" | 570 m || 
|-id=755 bgcolor=#fefefe
| 530755 ||  || — || September 4, 2007 || Catalina || CSS || NYS || align=right data-sort-value="0.59" | 590 m || 
|-id=756 bgcolor=#fefefe
| 530756 ||  || — || October 12, 2004 || Socorro || LINEAR ||  || align=right data-sort-value="0.91" | 910 m || 
|-id=757 bgcolor=#fefefe
| 530757 ||  || — || October 21, 2011 || Mount Lemmon || Mount Lemmon Survey ||  || align=right data-sort-value="0.83" | 830 m || 
|-id=758 bgcolor=#fefefe
| 530758 ||  || — || September 27, 2011 || Mount Lemmon || Mount Lemmon Survey ||  || align=right data-sort-value="0.71" | 710 m || 
|-id=759 bgcolor=#fefefe
| 530759 ||  || — || September 27, 2011 || Mount Lemmon || Mount Lemmon Survey ||  || align=right data-sort-value="0.58" | 580 m || 
|-id=760 bgcolor=#fefefe
| 530760 ||  || — || September 23, 2011 || Mount Lemmon || Mount Lemmon Survey ||  || align=right data-sort-value="0.60" | 600 m || 
|-id=761 bgcolor=#d6d6d6
| 530761 ||  || — || March 19, 2009 || Mount Lemmon || Mount Lemmon Survey ||  || align=right | 3.6 km || 
|-id=762 bgcolor=#d6d6d6
| 530762 ||  || — || September 22, 2011 || Mount Lemmon || Mount Lemmon Survey ||  || align=right | 2.9 km || 
|-id=763 bgcolor=#fefefe
| 530763 ||  || — || October 24, 2011 || Haleakala || Pan-STARRS ||  || align=right data-sort-value="0.59" | 590 m || 
|-id=764 bgcolor=#fefefe
| 530764 ||  || — || September 21, 2011 || Kitt Peak || Spacewatch ||  || align=right data-sort-value="0.58" | 580 m || 
|-id=765 bgcolor=#fefefe
| 530765 ||  || — || October 25, 2011 || Haleakala || Pan-STARRS ||  || align=right data-sort-value="0.66" | 660 m || 
|-id=766 bgcolor=#FA8072
| 530766 ||  || — || September 5, 2011 || La Sagra || OAM Obs. ||  || align=right data-sort-value="0.60" | 600 m || 
|-id=767 bgcolor=#fefefe
| 530767 ||  || — || September 20, 2011 || Mount Lemmon || Mount Lemmon Survey ||  || align=right data-sort-value="0.56" | 560 m || 
|-id=768 bgcolor=#fefefe
| 530768 ||  || — || October 3, 2011 || XuYi || PMO NEO ||  || align=right data-sort-value="0.62" | 620 m || 
|-id=769 bgcolor=#d6d6d6
| 530769 ||  || — || October 21, 2011 || Kitt Peak || Spacewatch ||  || align=right | 2.8 km || 
|-id=770 bgcolor=#fefefe
| 530770 ||  || — || October 24, 2011 || Haleakala || Pan-STARRS || (1338) || align=right data-sort-value="0.62" | 620 m || 
|-id=771 bgcolor=#fefefe
| 530771 ||  || — || October 25, 2011 || Kitt Peak || Spacewatch ||  || align=right data-sort-value="0.58" | 580 m || 
|-id=772 bgcolor=#E9E9E9
| 530772 ||  || — || August 7, 2010 || WISE || WISE ||  || align=right | 2.7 km || 
|-id=773 bgcolor=#fefefe
| 530773 ||  || — || October 26, 2011 || Haleakala || Pan-STARRS ||  || align=right data-sort-value="0.57" | 570 m || 
|-id=774 bgcolor=#d6d6d6
| 530774 ||  || — || October 19, 2011 || Mount Lemmon || Mount Lemmon Survey ||  || align=right | 2.7 km || 
|-id=775 bgcolor=#fefefe
| 530775 ||  || — || October 26, 2011 || Haleakala || Pan-STARRS ||  || align=right data-sort-value="0.71" | 710 m || 
|-id=776 bgcolor=#fefefe
| 530776 ||  || — || December 21, 2008 || Mount Lemmon || Mount Lemmon Survey ||  || align=right data-sort-value="0.39" | 390 m || 
|-id=777 bgcolor=#E9E9E9
| 530777 ||  || — || August 27, 2006 || Kitt Peak || Spacewatch || AGN || align=right data-sort-value="0.81" | 810 m || 
|-id=778 bgcolor=#fefefe
| 530778 ||  || — || October 6, 2004 || Kitt Peak || Spacewatch ||  || align=right data-sort-value="0.75" | 750 m || 
|-id=779 bgcolor=#fefefe
| 530779 ||  || — || October 24, 2011 || Haleakala || Pan-STARRS || V || align=right data-sort-value="0.54" | 540 m || 
|-id=780 bgcolor=#fefefe
| 530780 ||  || — || September 3, 2007 || Catalina || CSS ||  || align=right data-sort-value="0.85" | 850 m || 
|-id=781 bgcolor=#fefefe
| 530781 ||  || — || October 25, 2011 || Haleakala || Pan-STARRS ||  || align=right | 1.0 km || 
|-id=782 bgcolor=#fefefe
| 530782 ||  || — || October 3, 2011 || Mount Lemmon || Mount Lemmon Survey ||  || align=right data-sort-value="0.46" | 460 m || 
|-id=783 bgcolor=#fefefe
| 530783 ||  || — || October 25, 2011 || Haleakala || Pan-STARRS ||  || align=right data-sort-value="0.60" | 600 m || 
|-id=784 bgcolor=#fefefe
| 530784 ||  || — || October 25, 2011 || Haleakala || Pan-STARRS || V || align=right data-sort-value="0.61" | 610 m || 
|-id=785 bgcolor=#fefefe
| 530785 ||  || — || November 20, 2001 || Socorro || LINEAR ||  || align=right data-sort-value="0.59" | 590 m || 
|-id=786 bgcolor=#fefefe
| 530786 ||  || — || September 24, 2004 || Kitt Peak || Spacewatch ||  || align=right data-sort-value="0.37" | 370 m || 
|-id=787 bgcolor=#fefefe
| 530787 ||  || — || June 14, 2007 || Kitt Peak || Spacewatch ||  || align=right data-sort-value="0.70" | 700 m || 
|-id=788 bgcolor=#fefefe
| 530788 ||  || — || October 24, 2011 || Haleakala || Pan-STARRS ||  || align=right data-sort-value="0.79" | 790 m || 
|-id=789 bgcolor=#d6d6d6
| 530789 ||  || — || October 26, 2005 || Kitt Peak || Spacewatch ||  || align=right | 2.4 km || 
|-id=790 bgcolor=#fefefe
| 530790 ||  || — || October 26, 2011 || Haleakala || Pan-STARRS ||  || align=right data-sort-value="0.86" | 860 m || 
|-id=791 bgcolor=#fefefe
| 530791 ||  || — || October 18, 2011 || Kitt Peak || Spacewatch ||  || align=right data-sort-value="0.64" | 640 m || 
|-id=792 bgcolor=#fefefe
| 530792 ||  || — || October 26, 2011 || Haleakala || Pan-STARRS ||  || align=right data-sort-value="0.71" | 710 m || 
|-id=793 bgcolor=#d6d6d6
| 530793 ||  || — || December 14, 2006 || Socorro || LINEAR ||  || align=right | 3.2 km || 
|-id=794 bgcolor=#fefefe
| 530794 ||  || — || October 27, 2011 || Kitt Peak || Spacewatch ||  || align=right data-sort-value="0.59" | 590 m || 
|-id=795 bgcolor=#d6d6d6
| 530795 ||  || — || October 27, 2011 || Mount Lemmon || Mount Lemmon Survey || SHU3:2 || align=right | 5.8 km || 
|-id=796 bgcolor=#fefefe
| 530796 ||  || — || September 19, 2011 || Haleakala || Pan-STARRS ||  || align=right data-sort-value="0.62" | 620 m || 
|-id=797 bgcolor=#d6d6d6
| 530797 ||  || — || October 16, 2011 || Kitt Peak || Spacewatch ||  || align=right | 3.2 km || 
|-id=798 bgcolor=#fefefe
| 530798 ||  || — || October 19, 2011 || Kitt Peak || Spacewatch ||  || align=right data-sort-value="0.61" | 610 m || 
|-id=799 bgcolor=#d6d6d6
| 530799 ||  || — || October 27, 2005 || Kitt Peak || Spacewatch ||  || align=right | 2.3 km || 
|-id=800 bgcolor=#fefefe
| 530800 ||  || — || October 24, 2011 || Kitt Peak || Spacewatch ||  || align=right data-sort-value="0.64" | 640 m || 
|}

530801–530900 

|-bgcolor=#fefefe
| 530801 ||  || — || October 25, 2011 || Haleakala || Pan-STARRS ||  || align=right data-sort-value="0.59" | 590 m || 
|-id=802 bgcolor=#fefefe
| 530802 ||  || — || October 25, 2011 || Haleakala || Pan-STARRS ||  || align=right data-sort-value="0.80" | 800 m || 
|-id=803 bgcolor=#fefefe
| 530803 ||  || — || September 14, 2007 || Mount Lemmon || Mount Lemmon Survey ||  || align=right data-sort-value="0.75" | 750 m || 
|-id=804 bgcolor=#fefefe
| 530804 ||  || — || November 23, 1997 || Kitt Peak || Spacewatch || critical || align=right data-sort-value="0.47" | 470 m || 
|-id=805 bgcolor=#fefefe
| 530805 ||  || — || October 26, 2011 || Haleakala || Pan-STARRS ||  || align=right data-sort-value="0.48" | 480 m || 
|-id=806 bgcolor=#d6d6d6
| 530806 ||  || — || October 30, 2011 || Kitt Peak || Spacewatch ||  || align=right | 2.6 km || 
|-id=807 bgcolor=#fefefe
| 530807 ||  || — || October 30, 2011 || Kitt Peak || Spacewatch ||  || align=right data-sort-value="0.62" | 620 m || 
|-id=808 bgcolor=#d6d6d6
| 530808 ||  || — || October 30, 2011 || Kitt Peak || Spacewatch || EOS || align=right | 1.8 km || 
|-id=809 bgcolor=#fefefe
| 530809 ||  || — || September 24, 2011 || Mount Lemmon || Mount Lemmon Survey ||  || align=right data-sort-value="0.75" | 750 m || 
|-id=810 bgcolor=#d6d6d6
| 530810 ||  || — || September 24, 2011 || Mount Lemmon || Mount Lemmon Survey || LIX || align=right | 2.8 km || 
|-id=811 bgcolor=#fefefe
| 530811 ||  || — || September 3, 2007 || Catalina || CSS || NYS || align=right data-sort-value="0.52" | 520 m || 
|-id=812 bgcolor=#fefefe
| 530812 ||  || — || November 3, 2004 || Kitt Peak || Spacewatch ||  || align=right data-sort-value="0.65" | 650 m || 
|-id=813 bgcolor=#d6d6d6
| 530813 ||  || — || September 25, 2011 || Haleakala || Pan-STARRS || EOS || align=right | 1.8 km || 
|-id=814 bgcolor=#fefefe
| 530814 ||  || — || October 20, 2011 || Kitt Peak || Spacewatch ||  || align=right data-sort-value="0.82" | 820 m || 
|-id=815 bgcolor=#fefefe
| 530815 ||  || — || October 25, 2011 || Haleakala || Pan-STARRS ||  || align=right data-sort-value="0.62" | 620 m || 
|-id=816 bgcolor=#fefefe
| 530816 ||  || — || September 26, 2011 || Haleakala || Pan-STARRS ||  || align=right data-sort-value="0.68" | 680 m || 
|-id=817 bgcolor=#fefefe
| 530817 ||  || — || September 21, 2011 || Kitt Peak || Spacewatch ||  || align=right data-sort-value="0.54" | 540 m || 
|-id=818 bgcolor=#fefefe
| 530818 ||  || — || January 29, 2009 || Kitt Peak || Spacewatch ||  || align=right data-sort-value="0.56" | 560 m || 
|-id=819 bgcolor=#fefefe
| 530819 ||  || — || February 1, 2009 || Mount Lemmon || Mount Lemmon Survey ||  || align=right data-sort-value="0.64" | 640 m || 
|-id=820 bgcolor=#fefefe
| 530820 ||  || — || October 19, 2011 || Mount Lemmon || Mount Lemmon Survey ||  || align=right data-sort-value="0.82" | 820 m || 
|-id=821 bgcolor=#fefefe
| 530821 ||  || — || November 8, 2008 || Mount Lemmon || Mount Lemmon Survey ||  || align=right data-sort-value="0.77" | 770 m || 
|-id=822 bgcolor=#fefefe
| 530822 ||  || — || October 12, 2004 || Kitt Peak || Spacewatch ||  || align=right data-sort-value="0.42" | 420 m || 
|-id=823 bgcolor=#fefefe
| 530823 ||  || — || October 7, 2004 || Kitt Peak || Spacewatch ||  || align=right data-sort-value="0.47" | 470 m || 
|-id=824 bgcolor=#fefefe
| 530824 ||  || — || August 20, 2000 || Kitt Peak || Spacewatch ||  || align=right data-sort-value="0.47" | 470 m || 
|-id=825 bgcolor=#d6d6d6
| 530825 ||  || — || September 24, 2005 || Kitt Peak || Spacewatch || LUT || align=right | 2.8 km || 
|-id=826 bgcolor=#d6d6d6
| 530826 ||  || — || August 31, 2005 || Kitt Peak || Spacewatch ||  || align=right | 2.9 km || 
|-id=827 bgcolor=#fefefe
| 530827 ||  || — || September 21, 2011 || Kitt Peak || Spacewatch ||  || align=right data-sort-value="0.70" | 700 m || 
|-id=828 bgcolor=#fefefe
| 530828 ||  || — || September 25, 2011 || Haleakala || Pan-STARRS ||  || align=right data-sort-value="0.55" | 550 m || 
|-id=829 bgcolor=#fefefe
| 530829 ||  || — || February 2, 2009 || Mount Lemmon || Mount Lemmon Survey ||  || align=right data-sort-value="0.76" | 760 m || 
|-id=830 bgcolor=#fefefe
| 530830 ||  || — || October 25, 2011 || Haleakala || Pan-STARRS ||  || align=right data-sort-value="0.67" | 670 m || 
|-id=831 bgcolor=#fefefe
| 530831 ||  || — || September 24, 2011 || Mount Lemmon || Mount Lemmon Survey || NYS || align=right data-sort-value="0.49" | 490 m || 
|-id=832 bgcolor=#fefefe
| 530832 ||  || — || October 27, 2011 || Mount Lemmon || Mount Lemmon Survey ||  || align=right data-sort-value="0.64" | 640 m || 
|-id=833 bgcolor=#fefefe
| 530833 ||  || — || September 15, 2007 || Kitt Peak || Spacewatch ||  || align=right data-sort-value="0.65" | 650 m || 
|-id=834 bgcolor=#fefefe
| 530834 ||  || — || December 1, 2008 || Mount Lemmon || Mount Lemmon Survey ||  || align=right data-sort-value="0.56" | 560 m || 
|-id=835 bgcolor=#E9E9E9
| 530835 ||  || — || September 7, 2002 || Campo Imperatore || CINEOS ||  || align=right | 1.1 km || 
|-id=836 bgcolor=#d6d6d6
| 530836 ||  || — || October 19, 2011 || Kitt Peak || Spacewatch || EOS || align=right | 1.6 km || 
|-id=837 bgcolor=#d6d6d6
| 530837 ||  || — || September 21, 2011 || Catalina || CSS ||  || align=right | 3.1 km || 
|-id=838 bgcolor=#C2E0FF
| 530838 ||  || — || October 12, 2010 || Haleakala || Pan-STARRS || plutino || align=right | 111 km || 
|-id=839 bgcolor=#C2E0FF
| 530839 ||  || — || October 7, 2010 || Haleakala || Pan-STARRS || res3:5 || align=right | 181 km || 
|-id=840 bgcolor=#d6d6d6
| 530840 ||  || — || November 24, 2006 || Mount Lemmon || Mount Lemmon Survey ||  || align=right | 2.5 km || 
|-id=841 bgcolor=#d6d6d6
| 530841 ||  || — || November 18, 2006 || Mount Lemmon || Mount Lemmon Survey ||  || align=right | 2.6 km || 
|-id=842 bgcolor=#d6d6d6
| 530842 ||  || — || April 30, 2009 || Kitt Peak || Spacewatch ||  || align=right | 2.6 km || 
|-id=843 bgcolor=#d6d6d6
| 530843 ||  || — || October 25, 2011 || Haleakala || Pan-STARRS ||  || align=right | 2.0 km || 
|-id=844 bgcolor=#d6d6d6
| 530844 ||  || — || February 2, 2008 || Mount Lemmon || Mount Lemmon Survey ||  || align=right | 1.9 km || 
|-id=845 bgcolor=#d6d6d6
| 530845 ||  || — || May 15, 2010 || WISE || WISE ||  || align=right | 3.4 km || 
|-id=846 bgcolor=#d6d6d6
| 530846 ||  || — || October 24, 2011 || Kitt Peak || Spacewatch ||  || align=right | 1.9 km || 
|-id=847 bgcolor=#d6d6d6
| 530847 ||  || — || October 1, 2005 || Kitt Peak || Spacewatch ||  || align=right | 2.6 km || 
|-id=848 bgcolor=#d6d6d6
| 530848 ||  || — || October 24, 2011 || Haleakala || Pan-STARRS ||  || align=right | 1.8 km || 
|-id=849 bgcolor=#fefefe
| 530849 ||  || — || October 19, 2011 || Mount Lemmon || Mount Lemmon Survey ||  || align=right data-sort-value="0.68" | 680 m || 
|-id=850 bgcolor=#d6d6d6
| 530850 ||  || — || October 20, 2011 || Mount Lemmon || Mount Lemmon Survey ||  || align=right | 2.9 km || 
|-id=851 bgcolor=#fefefe
| 530851 ||  || — || October 23, 2011 || Haleakala || Pan-STARRS ||  || align=right data-sort-value="0.78" | 780 m || 
|-id=852 bgcolor=#fefefe
| 530852 ||  || — || October 26, 2011 || Haleakala || Pan-STARRS ||  || align=right data-sort-value="0.61" | 610 m || 
|-id=853 bgcolor=#d6d6d6
| 530853 ||  || — || October 25, 2011 || Haleakala || Pan-STARRS ||  || align=right | 2.7 km || 
|-id=854 bgcolor=#d6d6d6
| 530854 ||  || — || November 19, 2006 || Catalina || CSS ||  || align=right | 2.2 km || 
|-id=855 bgcolor=#d6d6d6
| 530855 ||  || — || October 26, 2011 || Haleakala || Pan-STARRS ||  || align=right | 2.6 km || 
|-id=856 bgcolor=#d6d6d6
| 530856 ||  || — || October 26, 2011 || Haleakala || Pan-STARRS ||  || align=right | 2.7 km || 
|-id=857 bgcolor=#d6d6d6
| 530857 ||  || — || October 1, 2011 || Kitt Peak || Spacewatch ||  || align=right | 2.8 km || 
|-id=858 bgcolor=#fefefe
| 530858 ||  || — || October 25, 2011 || Haleakala || Pan-STARRS ||  || align=right data-sort-value="0.70" | 700 m || 
|-id=859 bgcolor=#fefefe
| 530859 ||  || — || October 26, 2011 || Haleakala || Pan-STARRS ||  || align=right data-sort-value="0.68" | 680 m || 
|-id=860 bgcolor=#fefefe
| 530860 ||  || — || October 28, 2011 || Catalina || CSS ||  || align=right data-sort-value="0.78" | 780 m || 
|-id=861 bgcolor=#d6d6d6
| 530861 ||  || — || October 25, 2011 || Haleakala || Pan-STARRS || 7:4 || align=right | 2.4 km || 
|-id=862 bgcolor=#d6d6d6
| 530862 ||  || — || October 25, 2011 || Haleakala || Pan-STARRS ||  || align=right | 2.7 km || 
|-id=863 bgcolor=#FA8072
| 530863 ||  || — || October 26, 2011 || Haleakala || Pan-STARRS ||  || align=right data-sort-value="0.88" | 880 m || 
|-id=864 bgcolor=#fefefe
| 530864 ||  || — || November 15, 2011 || Kitt Peak || Spacewatch ||  || align=right data-sort-value="0.63" | 630 m || 
|-id=865 bgcolor=#fefefe
| 530865 ||  || — || January 15, 2009 || Kitt Peak || Spacewatch ||  || align=right | 1.0 km || 
|-id=866 bgcolor=#d6d6d6
| 530866 ||  || — || December 16, 2000 || Kitt Peak || Spacewatch ||  || align=right | 2.4 km || 
|-id=867 bgcolor=#fefefe
| 530867 ||  || — || August 13, 2007 || Socorro || LINEAR ||  || align=right data-sort-value="0.90" | 900 m || 
|-id=868 bgcolor=#fefefe
| 530868 ||  || — || October 25, 2011 || Haleakala || Pan-STARRS || V || align=right data-sort-value="0.53" | 530 m || 
|-id=869 bgcolor=#d6d6d6
| 530869 ||  || — || November 3, 2011 || Kitt Peak || Spacewatch ||  || align=right | 2.4 km || 
|-id=870 bgcolor=#d6d6d6
| 530870 ||  || — || November 3, 2011 || Kitt Peak || Spacewatch ||  || align=right | 2.8 km || 
|-id=871 bgcolor=#FFC2E0
| 530871 ||  || — || January 7, 2010 || WISE || WISE || APO +1km || align=right | 1.4 km || 
|-id=872 bgcolor=#fefefe
| 530872 ||  || — || November 16, 2011 || Mount Lemmon || Mount Lemmon Survey ||  || align=right data-sort-value="0.65" | 650 m || 
|-id=873 bgcolor=#fefefe
| 530873 ||  || — || October 18, 2011 || Kitt Peak || Spacewatch ||  || align=right data-sort-value="0.51" | 510 m || 
|-id=874 bgcolor=#fefefe
| 530874 ||  || — || October 22, 2011 || Kitt Peak || Spacewatch ||  || align=right data-sort-value="0.68" | 680 m || 
|-id=875 bgcolor=#d6d6d6
| 530875 ||  || — || October 26, 2011 || Haleakala || Pan-STARRS ||  || align=right | 2.9 km || 
|-id=876 bgcolor=#fefefe
| 530876 ||  || — || October 26, 2011 || Haleakala || Pan-STARRS ||  || align=right data-sort-value="0.79" | 790 m || 
|-id=877 bgcolor=#fefefe
| 530877 ||  || — || October 24, 2011 || Mount Lemmon || Mount Lemmon Survey ||  || align=right data-sort-value="0.60" | 600 m || 
|-id=878 bgcolor=#fefefe
| 530878 ||  || — || November 17, 2011 || Mount Lemmon || Mount Lemmon Survey ||  || align=right data-sort-value="0.60" | 600 m || 
|-id=879 bgcolor=#fefefe
| 530879 ||  || — || November 17, 2011 || Mount Lemmon || Mount Lemmon Survey ||  || align=right data-sort-value="0.71" | 710 m || 
|-id=880 bgcolor=#fefefe
| 530880 ||  || — || October 24, 2011 || Kitt Peak || Spacewatch || V || align=right data-sort-value="0.59" | 590 m || 
|-id=881 bgcolor=#fefefe
| 530881 ||  || — || October 21, 2011 || Mount Lemmon || Mount Lemmon Survey ||  || align=right data-sort-value="0.70" | 700 m || 
|-id=882 bgcolor=#d6d6d6
| 530882 ||  || — || May 22, 2003 || Kitt Peak || Spacewatch ||  || align=right | 3.4 km || 
|-id=883 bgcolor=#d6d6d6
| 530883 ||  || — || April 18, 2009 || Mount Lemmon || Mount Lemmon Survey || EOS || align=right | 1.5 km || 
|-id=884 bgcolor=#fefefe
| 530884 ||  || — || October 1, 2011 || Mount Lemmon || Mount Lemmon Survey ||  || align=right data-sort-value="0.82" | 820 m || 
|-id=885 bgcolor=#d6d6d6
| 530885 ||  || — || November 23, 2011 || Kitt Peak || Spacewatch ||  || align=right | 3.7 km || 
|-id=886 bgcolor=#fefefe
| 530886 ||  || — || October 26, 2011 || Haleakala || Pan-STARRS || NYS || align=right data-sort-value="0.50" | 500 m || 
|-id=887 bgcolor=#fefefe
| 530887 ||  || — || October 27, 2011 || Kitt Peak || Spacewatch ||  || align=right data-sort-value="0.67" | 670 m || 
|-id=888 bgcolor=#fefefe
| 530888 ||  || — || November 1, 2011 || Kitt Peak || Spacewatch ||  || align=right data-sort-value="0.61" | 610 m || 
|-id=889 bgcolor=#fefefe
| 530889 ||  || — || November 17, 2011 || Kitt Peak || Spacewatch ||  || align=right data-sort-value="0.55" | 550 m || 
|-id=890 bgcolor=#fefefe
| 530890 ||  || — || November 16, 2011 || Kitt Peak || Spacewatch ||  || align=right data-sort-value="0.60" | 600 m || 
|-id=891 bgcolor=#d6d6d6
| 530891 ||  || — || November 1, 2011 || Mount Lemmon || Mount Lemmon Survey ||  || align=right | 2.2 km || 
|-id=892 bgcolor=#fefefe
| 530892 ||  || — || November 23, 2011 || Socorro || LINEAR ||  || align=right | 1.4 km || 
|-id=893 bgcolor=#fefefe
| 530893 ||  || — || November 23, 2011 || Mount Lemmon || Mount Lemmon Survey ||  || align=right data-sort-value="0.67" | 670 m || 
|-id=894 bgcolor=#fefefe
| 530894 ||  || — || November 24, 2011 || Kitt Peak || Spacewatch ||  || align=right | 1.0 km || 
|-id=895 bgcolor=#d6d6d6
| 530895 ||  || — || October 26, 2011 || Haleakala || Pan-STARRS ||  || align=right | 2.3 km || 
|-id=896 bgcolor=#fefefe
| 530896 ||  || — || January 11, 2002 || Kitt Peak || Spacewatch ||  || align=right data-sort-value="0.53" | 530 m || 
|-id=897 bgcolor=#fefefe
| 530897 ||  || — || September 10, 2007 || Kitt Peak || Spacewatch || MAS || align=right data-sort-value="0.68" | 680 m || 
|-id=898 bgcolor=#fefefe
| 530898 ||  || — || November 18, 2011 || Kitt Peak || Spacewatch ||  || align=right data-sort-value="0.62" | 620 m || 
|-id=899 bgcolor=#fefefe
| 530899 ||  || — || November 1, 2011 || Mount Lemmon || Mount Lemmon Survey ||  || align=right | 1.0 km || 
|-id=900 bgcolor=#fefefe
| 530900 ||  || — || November 25, 2011 || Haleakala || Pan-STARRS ||  || align=right data-sort-value="0.85" | 850 m || 
|}

530901–531000 

|-bgcolor=#fefefe
| 530901 ||  || — || November 9, 1993 || Kitt Peak || Spacewatch ||  || align=right data-sort-value="0.65" | 650 m || 
|-id=902 bgcolor=#fefefe
| 530902 ||  || — || October 1, 2011 || Kitt Peak || Spacewatch ||  || align=right data-sort-value="0.73" | 730 m || 
|-id=903 bgcolor=#d6d6d6
| 530903 ||  || — || October 26, 2011 || Haleakala || Pan-STARRS ||  || align=right | 2.5 km || 
|-id=904 bgcolor=#d6d6d6
| 530904 ||  || — || October 25, 2011 || Haleakala || Pan-STARRS ||  || align=right | 2.5 km || 
|-id=905 bgcolor=#fefefe
| 530905 ||  || — || November 24, 2011 || Haleakala || Pan-STARRS ||  || align=right data-sort-value="0.69" | 690 m || 
|-id=906 bgcolor=#d6d6d6
| 530906 ||  || — || November 24, 2011 || Haleakala || Pan-STARRS || EOS || align=right | 1.5 km || 
|-id=907 bgcolor=#fefefe
| 530907 ||  || — || November 1, 2011 || Mount Lemmon || Mount Lemmon Survey ||  || align=right data-sort-value="0.83" | 830 m || 
|-id=908 bgcolor=#fefefe
| 530908 ||  || — || September 10, 2007 || Mount Lemmon || Mount Lemmon Survey ||  || align=right data-sort-value="0.63" | 630 m || 
|-id=909 bgcolor=#d6d6d6
| 530909 ||  || — || October 21, 2011 || Mount Lemmon || Mount Lemmon Survey ||  || align=right | 2.9 km || 
|-id=910 bgcolor=#d6d6d6
| 530910 ||  || — || October 26, 2011 || Haleakala || Pan-STARRS ||  || align=right | 2.5 km || 
|-id=911 bgcolor=#fefefe
| 530911 ||  || — || November 16, 2011 || Kitt Peak || Spacewatch ||  || align=right data-sort-value="0.57" | 570 m || 
|-id=912 bgcolor=#fefefe
| 530912 ||  || — || October 26, 2011 || Haleakala || Pan-STARRS ||  || align=right data-sort-value="0.68" | 680 m || 
|-id=913 bgcolor=#fefefe
| 530913 ||  || — || October 24, 2011 || Haleakala || Pan-STARRS ||  || align=right data-sort-value="0.45" | 450 m || 
|-id=914 bgcolor=#fefefe
| 530914 ||  || — || October 21, 2011 || Mount Lemmon || Mount Lemmon Survey || V || align=right data-sort-value="0.45" | 450 m || 
|-id=915 bgcolor=#d6d6d6
| 530915 ||  || — || November 6, 2005 || Mount Lemmon || Mount Lemmon Survey || Tj (2.99) || align=right | 3.2 km || 
|-id=916 bgcolor=#d6d6d6
| 530916 ||  || — || November 27, 2006 || Mount Lemmon || Mount Lemmon Survey ||  || align=right | 2.2 km || 
|-id=917 bgcolor=#d6d6d6
| 530917 ||  || — || November 23, 2011 || Mount Lemmon || Mount Lemmon Survey ||  || align=right | 3.3 km || 
|-id=918 bgcolor=#fefefe
| 530918 ||  || — || January 20, 2009 || Mount Lemmon || Mount Lemmon Survey ||  || align=right data-sort-value="0.43" | 430 m || 
|-id=919 bgcolor=#fefefe
| 530919 ||  || — || October 26, 2011 || Haleakala || Pan-STARRS || MAS || align=right data-sort-value="0.50" | 500 m || 
|-id=920 bgcolor=#d6d6d6
| 530920 ||  || — || November 3, 2011 || Kitt Peak || Spacewatch ||  || align=right | 2.7 km || 
|-id=921 bgcolor=#d6d6d6
| 530921 ||  || — || November 25, 2011 || Haleakala || Pan-STARRS ||  || align=right | 2.6 km || 
|-id=922 bgcolor=#d6d6d6
| 530922 ||  || — || June 17, 2010 || WISE || WISE ||  || align=right | 2.9 km || 
|-id=923 bgcolor=#d6d6d6
| 530923 ||  || — || October 26, 2011 || Haleakala || Pan-STARRS ||  || align=right | 3.2 km || 
|-id=924 bgcolor=#fefefe
| 530924 ||  || — || August 24, 2007 || Kitt Peak || Spacewatch ||  || align=right data-sort-value="0.64" | 640 m || 
|-id=925 bgcolor=#fefefe
| 530925 ||  || — || November 25, 2011 || Haleakala || Pan-STARRS || MAS || align=right data-sort-value="0.54" | 540 m || 
|-id=926 bgcolor=#d6d6d6
| 530926 ||  || — || November 24, 2000 || Kitt Peak || Spacewatch ||  || align=right | 3.3 km || 
|-id=927 bgcolor=#fefefe
| 530927 ||  || — || January 25, 2009 || Kitt Peak || Spacewatch ||  || align=right data-sort-value="0.39" | 390 m || 
|-id=928 bgcolor=#d6d6d6
| 530928 ||  || — || October 23, 2011 || Haleakala || Pan-STARRS ||  || align=right | 3.1 km || 
|-id=929 bgcolor=#d6d6d6
| 530929 ||  || — || October 26, 2011 || Haleakala || Pan-STARRS ||  || align=right | 2.5 km || 
|-id=930 bgcolor=#C2E0FF
| 530930 ||  || — || October 13, 2010 || Haleakala || Pan-STARRS || NTcritical || align=right | 156 km || 
|-id=931 bgcolor=#d6d6d6
| 530931 ||  || — || November 17, 2011 || Mount Lemmon || Mount Lemmon Survey ||  || align=right | 2.4 km || 
|-id=932 bgcolor=#d6d6d6
| 530932 ||  || — || November 25, 2011 || Haleakala || Pan-STARRS ||  || align=right | 2.8 km || 
|-id=933 bgcolor=#d6d6d6
| 530933 ||  || — || November 24, 2011 || Mount Lemmon || Mount Lemmon Survey ||  || align=right | 3.9 km || 
|-id=934 bgcolor=#d6d6d6
| 530934 ||  || — || November 30, 2011 || Kitt Peak || Spacewatch ||  || align=right | 2.9 km || 
|-id=935 bgcolor=#d6d6d6
| 530935 ||  || — || November 26, 2011 || Mount Lemmon || Mount Lemmon Survey ||  || align=right | 3.1 km || 
|-id=936 bgcolor=#d6d6d6
| 530936 ||  || — || July 1, 2010 || WISE || WISE || Tj (2.93) || align=right | 4.7 km || 
|-id=937 bgcolor=#fefefe
| 530937 ||  || — || November 18, 2011 || Mount Lemmon || Mount Lemmon Survey ||  || align=right data-sort-value="0.69" | 690 m || 
|-id=938 bgcolor=#FFC2E0
| 530938 ||  || — || January 16, 2010 || WISE || WISE || ATE || align=right data-sort-value="0.41" | 410 m || 
|-id=939 bgcolor=#fefefe
| 530939 ||  || — || October 26, 2011 || Haleakala || Pan-STARRS ||  || align=right data-sort-value="0.52" | 520 m || 
|-id=940 bgcolor=#FFC2E0
| 530940 ||  || — || December 3, 2011 || ESA OGS || ESA OGS || AMO +1kmcritical || align=right data-sort-value="0.81" | 810 m || 
|-id=941 bgcolor=#C2E0FF
| 530941 ||  || — || December 6, 2011 || Haleakala || Pan-STARRS || cubewano? || align=right | 176 km || 
|-id=942 bgcolor=#fefefe
| 530942 ||  || — || December 15, 2011 || Haleakala || Pan-STARRS ||  || align=right | 1.0 km || 
|-id=943 bgcolor=#fefefe
| 530943 ||  || — || December 6, 2011 || Haleakala || Pan-STARRS ||  || align=right data-sort-value="0.82" | 820 m || 
|-id=944 bgcolor=#fefefe
| 530944 ||  || — || November 17, 2011 || Mount Lemmon || Mount Lemmon Survey ||  || align=right data-sort-value="0.70" | 700 m || 
|-id=945 bgcolor=#fefefe
| 530945 ||  || — || December 24, 2011 || Mount Lemmon || Mount Lemmon Survey ||  || align=right data-sort-value="0.56" | 560 m || 
|-id=946 bgcolor=#fefefe
| 530946 ||  || — || October 15, 2007 || Kitt Peak || Spacewatch ||  || align=right data-sort-value="0.71" | 710 m || 
|-id=947 bgcolor=#fefefe
| 530947 ||  || — || October 30, 2007 || Mount Lemmon || Mount Lemmon Survey || NYS || align=right data-sort-value="0.46" | 460 m || 
|-id=948 bgcolor=#fefefe
| 530948 ||  || — || November 22, 2011 || Mount Lemmon || Mount Lemmon Survey ||  || align=right data-sort-value="0.71" | 710 m || 
|-id=949 bgcolor=#fefefe
| 530949 ||  || — || December 26, 2011 || Kitt Peak || Spacewatch ||  || align=right data-sort-value="0.54" | 540 m || 
|-id=950 bgcolor=#fefefe
| 530950 ||  || — || February 9, 2005 || Anderson Mesa || LONEOS ||  || align=right data-sort-value="0.65" | 650 m || 
|-id=951 bgcolor=#fefefe
| 530951 ||  || — || December 26, 2011 || Kitt Peak || Spacewatch ||  || align=right data-sort-value="0.57" | 570 m || 
|-id=952 bgcolor=#fefefe
| 530952 ||  || — || December 29, 2011 || Kitt Peak || Spacewatch ||  || align=right data-sort-value="0.65" | 650 m || 
|-id=953 bgcolor=#fefefe
| 530953 ||  || — || December 31, 2011 || Kitt Peak || Spacewatch || NYS || align=right data-sort-value="0.48" | 480 m || 
|-id=954 bgcolor=#E9E9E9
| 530954 ||  || — || November 27, 2011 || Mount Lemmon || Mount Lemmon Survey || HNS || align=right | 1.2 km || 
|-id=955 bgcolor=#C2E0FF
| 530955 ||  || — || May 6, 2010 || Haleakala || Pan-STARRS || SDO || align=right | 257 km || 
|-id=956 bgcolor=#fefefe
| 530956 ||  || — || December 29, 2011 || Kitt Peak || Spacewatch ||  || align=right data-sort-value="0.69" | 690 m || 
|-id=957 bgcolor=#fefefe
| 530957 ||  || — || December 27, 2011 || Mount Lemmon || Mount Lemmon Survey ||  || align=right data-sort-value="0.57" | 570 m || 
|-id=958 bgcolor=#fefefe
| 530958 ||  || — || December 27, 2011 || Mount Lemmon || Mount Lemmon Survey ||  || align=right data-sort-value="0.58" | 580 m || 
|-id=959 bgcolor=#d6d6d6
| 530959 ||  || — || December 31, 2011 || Mount Lemmon || Mount Lemmon Survey ||  || align=right | 2.2 km || 
|-id=960 bgcolor=#fefefe
| 530960 ||  || — || November 30, 2011 || Mount Lemmon || Mount Lemmon Survey ||  || align=right data-sort-value="0.68" | 680 m || 
|-id=961 bgcolor=#fefefe
| 530961 ||  || — || January 1, 2012 || Mount Lemmon || Mount Lemmon Survey ||  || align=right data-sort-value="0.47" | 470 m || 
|-id=962 bgcolor=#fefefe
| 530962 ||  || — || January 2, 2012 || Kitt Peak || Spacewatch ||  || align=right data-sort-value="0.52" | 520 m || 
|-id=963 bgcolor=#fefefe
| 530963 ||  || — || January 2, 2012 || Kitt Peak || Spacewatch ||  || align=right data-sort-value="0.62" | 620 m || 
|-id=964 bgcolor=#fefefe
| 530964 ||  || — || January 6, 2012 || Kitt Peak || Spacewatch ||  || align=right data-sort-value="0.44" | 440 m || 
|-id=965 bgcolor=#fefefe
| 530965 ||  || — || December 24, 2011 || Mount Lemmon || Mount Lemmon Survey || NYS || align=right data-sort-value="0.51" | 510 m || 
|-id=966 bgcolor=#fefefe
| 530966 ||  || — || January 1, 2008 || Mount Lemmon || Mount Lemmon Survey ||  || align=right data-sort-value="0.94" | 940 m || 
|-id=967 bgcolor=#E9E9E9
| 530967 ||  || — || December 2, 2010 || Kitt Peak || Spacewatch ||  || align=right | 1.1 km || 
|-id=968 bgcolor=#fefefe
| 530968 ||  || — || November 19, 2003 || Kitt Peak || Spacewatch ||  || align=right data-sort-value="0.73" | 730 m || 
|-id=969 bgcolor=#fefefe
| 530969 ||  || — || January 2, 2012 || Mount Lemmon || Mount Lemmon Survey ||  || align=right data-sort-value="0.98" | 980 m || 
|-id=970 bgcolor=#fefefe
| 530970 ||  || — || January 4, 2012 || Mount Lemmon || Mount Lemmon Survey ||  || align=right data-sort-value="0.71" | 710 m || 
|-id=971 bgcolor=#fefefe
| 530971 ||  || — || January 4, 2012 || Mount Lemmon || Mount Lemmon Survey ||  || align=right data-sort-value="0.65" | 650 m || 
|-id=972 bgcolor=#fefefe
| 530972 ||  || — || December 27, 2011 || Mount Lemmon || Mount Lemmon Survey ||  || align=right data-sort-value="0.58" | 580 m || 
|-id=973 bgcolor=#fefefe
| 530973 ||  || — || January 18, 2012 || Kitt Peak || Spacewatch ||  || align=right data-sort-value="0.58" | 580 m || 
|-id=974 bgcolor=#FFC2E0
| 530974 ||  || — || January 19, 2012 || Haleakala || Pan-STARRS || APOPHA || align=right data-sort-value="0.25" | 250 m || 
|-id=975 bgcolor=#fefefe
| 530975 ||  || — || January 19, 2012 || Kitt Peak || Spacewatch ||  || align=right data-sort-value="0.84" | 840 m || 
|-id=976 bgcolor=#fefefe
| 530976 ||  || — || September 2, 2010 || Mount Lemmon || Mount Lemmon Survey ||  || align=right | 1.0 km || 
|-id=977 bgcolor=#E9E9E9
| 530977 ||  || — || January 19, 2012 || Haleakala || Pan-STARRS ||  || align=right | 1.3 km || 
|-id=978 bgcolor=#E9E9E9
| 530978 ||  || — || December 27, 2011 || Mount Lemmon || Mount Lemmon Survey ||  || align=right | 1.3 km || 
|-id=979 bgcolor=#E9E9E9
| 530979 ||  || — || January 4, 2012 || Mount Lemmon || Mount Lemmon Survey ||  || align=right | 2.4 km || 
|-id=980 bgcolor=#FA8072
| 530980 ||  || — || August 21, 2007 || Anderson Mesa || LONEOS ||  || align=right | 1.6 km || 
|-id=981 bgcolor=#fefefe
| 530981 ||  || — || October 15, 2007 || Mount Lemmon || Mount Lemmon Survey ||  || align=right data-sort-value="0.52" | 520 m || 
|-id=982 bgcolor=#fefefe
| 530982 ||  || — || January 19, 2012 || Mount Lemmon || Mount Lemmon Survey ||  || align=right data-sort-value="0.67" | 670 m || 
|-id=983 bgcolor=#fefefe
| 530983 ||  || — || January 21, 2012 || Kitt Peak || Spacewatch || NYS || align=right data-sort-value="0.52" | 520 m || 
|-id=984 bgcolor=#fefefe
| 530984 ||  || — || February 2, 2005 || Kitt Peak || Spacewatch ||  || align=right data-sort-value="0.75" | 750 m || 
|-id=985 bgcolor=#fefefe
| 530985 ||  || — || October 30, 2007 || Mount Lemmon || Mount Lemmon Survey || MAS || align=right data-sort-value="0.57" | 570 m || 
|-id=986 bgcolor=#fefefe
| 530986 ||  || — || November 30, 2011 || Mount Lemmon || Mount Lemmon Survey ||  || align=right data-sort-value="0.89" | 890 m || 
|-id=987 bgcolor=#fefefe
| 530987 ||  || — || January 20, 2012 || Mount Lemmon || Mount Lemmon Survey ||  || align=right data-sort-value="0.82" | 820 m || 
|-id=988 bgcolor=#fefefe
| 530988 ||  || — || January 26, 2012 || Haleakala || Pan-STARRS ||  || align=right data-sort-value="0.56" | 560 m || 
|-id=989 bgcolor=#fefefe
| 530989 ||  || — || January 26, 2012 || Haleakala || Pan-STARRS ||  || align=right data-sort-value="0.58" | 580 m || 
|-id=990 bgcolor=#FA8072
| 530990 ||  || — || January 27, 2012 || Catalina || CSS ||  || align=right data-sort-value="0.80" | 800 m || 
|-id=991 bgcolor=#FA8072
| 530991 ||  || — || January 27, 2012 || Mount Lemmon || Mount Lemmon Survey ||  || align=right data-sort-value="0.38" | 380 m || 
|-id=992 bgcolor=#fefefe
| 530992 ||  || — || January 19, 2012 || Kitt Peak || Spacewatch ||  || align=right data-sort-value="0.58" | 580 m || 
|-id=993 bgcolor=#fefefe
| 530993 ||  || — || January 19, 2012 || Kitt Peak || Spacewatch ||  || align=right data-sort-value="0.50" | 500 m || 
|-id=994 bgcolor=#fefefe
| 530994 ||  || — || January 26, 2012 || Haleakala || Pan-STARRS ||  || align=right data-sort-value="0.54" | 540 m || 
|-id=995 bgcolor=#fefefe
| 530995 ||  || — || January 27, 2012 || Kitt Peak || Spacewatch ||  || align=right data-sort-value="0.67" | 670 m || 
|-id=996 bgcolor=#fefefe
| 530996 ||  || — || January 27, 2012 || Kitt Peak || Spacewatch ||  || align=right data-sort-value="0.57" | 570 m || 
|-id=997 bgcolor=#E9E9E9
| 530997 ||  || — || January 19, 2012 || Haleakala || Pan-STARRS || MAR || align=right data-sort-value="0.99" | 990 m || 
|-id=998 bgcolor=#fefefe
| 530998 ||  || — || January 19, 2012 || Kitt Peak || Spacewatch ||  || align=right data-sort-value="0.60" | 600 m || 
|-id=999 bgcolor=#fefefe
| 530999 ||  || — || January 27, 2012 || Mount Lemmon || Mount Lemmon Survey ||  || align=right data-sort-value="0.52" | 520 m || 
|-id=000 bgcolor=#fefefe
| 531000 ||  || — || May 4, 2002 || Kitt Peak || Spacewatch ||  || align=right data-sort-value="0.51" | 510 m || 
|}

References

External links 
 Discovery Circumstances: Numbered Minor Planets (530001)–(535000) (IAU Minor Planet Center)

0530